= ATC code J01 =

Pharmaceutical drug classification

ATC code J01 Antibacterials for systemic use is a therapeutic subgroup of the Anatomical Therapeutic Chemical Classification System, a system of alphanumeric codes developed by the World Health Organization (WHO) for the classification of drugs and other medical products. Subgroup J01 is part of the anatomical group J Antiinfectives for systemic use.

Codes for veterinary use (ATCvet codes) can be created by placing the letter Q in front of the human ATC code: for example, QJ01. ATCvet codes without corresponding human ATC codes are cited with the leading Q in the following list.
National versions of the ATC classification may include additional codes not present in this list, which follows the WHO version.

== J01A Tetracyclines ==
=== J01AA Tetracyclines ===
J01AA01 Demeclocycline
J01AA02 Doxycycline
J01AA03 Chlortetracycline
J01AA04 Lymecycline
J01AA05 Metacycline
J01AA06 Oxytetracycline
J01AA07 Tetracycline
J01AA08 Minocycline
J01AA09 Rolitetracycline
J01AA10 Penimepicycline
J01AA11 Clomocycline
J01AA12 Tigecycline
J01AA13 Eravacycline
J01AA14 Sarecycline
J01AA15 Omadacycline
J01AA20 Combinations of tetracyclines
QJ01AA53 Chlortetracycline, combinations
J01AA56 Oxytetracycline, combinations

== J01B Amphenicols ==
=== J01BA Amphenicols ===
J01BA01 Chloramphenicol
J01BA02 Thiamphenicol
J01BA52 Thiamphenicol, combinations
QJ01BA90 Florfenicol
QJ01BA99 Amphenicols, combinations

== J01C Beta-lactam antibacterials, penicillins ==
=== J01CA Penicillins with extended spectrum ===
J01CA01 Ampicillin
J01CA02 Pivampicillin
J01CA03 Carbenicillin
J01CA04 Amoxicillin
J01CA05 Carindacillin
J01CA06 Bacampicillin
J01CA07 Epicillin
J01CA08 Pivmecillinam
J01CA09 Azlocillin
J01CA10 Mezlocillin
J01CA11 Mecillinam
J01CA12 Piperacillin
J01CA13 Ticarcillin
J01CA14 Metampicillin
J01CA15 Talampicillin
J01CA16 Sulbenicillin
J01CA17 Temocillin
J01CA18 Hetacillin
J01CA19 Aspoxicillin
J01CA20 Combinations
J01CA51 Ampicillin, combinations

=== J01CE Beta-lactamase-sensitive penicillins ===
J01CE01 Benzylpenicillin
J01CE02 Phenoxymethylpenicillin
J01CE03 Propicillin
J01CE04 Azidocillin
J01CE05 Pheneticillin
J01CE06 Penamecillin
J01CE07 Clometocillin
J01CE08 Benzathine benzylpenicillin
J01CE09 Procaine benzylpenicillin
J01CE10 Benzathine phenoxymethylpenicillin
J01CE30 Combinations
QJ01CE90 Penethamate hydroiodide
QJ01CE91 Benethamine penicillin

=== J01CF Beta-lactamase-resistant penicillins ===
J01CF01 Dicloxacillin
J01CF02 Cloxacillin
J01CF03 Methicillin
J01CF04 Oxacillin
J01CF05 Flucloxacillin
J01CF06 Nafcillin

=== J01CG Beta-lactamase inhibitors ===
J01CG01 Sulbactam
J01CG02 Tazobactam
J01CG30 Sulbactam and durlobactam

=== J01CR Combinations of penicillins, including beta-lactamase inhibitors ===
J01CR01 Ampicillin and beta-lactamase inhibitor
J01CR02 Amoxicillin and beta-lactamase inhibitor
J01CR03 Ticarcillin and beta-lactamase inhibitor
J01CR04 Sultamicillin
J01CR05 Piperacillin and beta-lactamase inhibitor
J01CR50 Combinations of penicillins

== J01D Other beta-lactam antibacterials ==
=== J01DB First-generation cephalosporins ===
J01DB01 Cefalexin
J01DB02 Cefaloridine
J01DB03 Cefalotin
J01DB04 Cefazolin
J01DB05 Cefadroxil
J01DB06 Cefazedone
J01DB07 Cefatrizine
J01DB08 Cefapirin
J01DB09 Cefradine
J01DB10 Cefacetrile
J01DB11 Cefroxadine
J01DB12 Ceftezole

=== J01DC Second-generation cephalosporins ===
J01DC01 Cefoxitin
J01DC02 Cefuroxime
J01DC03 Cefamandole
J01DC04 Cefaclor
J01DC05 Cefotetan
J01DC06 Cefonicide
J01DC07 Cefotiam
J01DC08 Loracarbef
J01DC09 Cefmetazole
J01DC10 Cefprozil
J01DC11 Ceforanide
J01DC12 Cefminox
J01DC13 Cefbuperazone
J01DC14 Flomoxef
J01DC52 Cefuroxime and beta-lactamase inhibitor

=== J01DD Third-generation cephalosporins ===
J01DD01 Cefotaxime
J01DD02 Ceftazidime
J01DD03 Cefsulodin
J01DD04 Ceftriaxone
J01DD05 Cefmenoxime
J01DD06 Latamoxef
J01DD07 Ceftizoxime
J01DD08 Cefixime
J01DD09 Cefodizime
J01DD10 Cefetamet
J01DD11 Cefpiramide
J01DD12 Cefoperazone
J01DD13 Cefpodoxime
J01DD14 Ceftibuten
J01DD15 Cefdinir
J01DD16 Cefditoren
J01DD17 Cefcapene
J01DD18 Cefteram
J01DD51 Cefotaxime and beta-lactamase inhibitor
J01DD52 Ceftazidime and beta-lactamase inhibitor
J01DD54 Ceftriaxone, combinations
J01DD58 Cefixime and beta-lactamase inhibitor
J01DD62 Cefoperazone and beta-lactamase inhibitor
J01DD63 Ceftriaxone and beta-lactamase inhibitor
J01DD64 Cefpodoxime and beta-lactamase inhibitor
QJ01DD90 Ceftiofur
QJ01DD91 Cefovecin
QJ01DD99 Ceftiofur, combinations

=== J01DE Fourth-generation cephalosporins ===
J01DE01 Cefepime
J01DE02 Cefpirome
J01DE03 Cefozopran
J01DE51 Cefepime and beta-lactamase inhibitor
QJ01DE90 Cefquinome

=== J01DF Monobactams ===
J01DF01 Aztreonam
J01DF02 Carumonam
J01DF51 Aztreonam and beta-lactamase inhibitor

=== J01DH Carbapenems ===
J01DH02 Meropenem
J01DH03 Ertapenem
J01DH04 Doripenem
J01DH05 Biapenem
J01DH06 Tebipenem pivoxil
J01DH51 Imipenem and cilastatin
J01DH52 Meropenem and vaborbactam
J01DH55 Panipenem and betamipron
J01DH56 Imipenem, cilastatin and relebactam

=== J01DI Other cephalosporins and penems ===
J01DI01 Ceftobiprole medocaril
J01DI02 Ceftaroline fosamil
J01DI03 Faropenem
J01DI04 Cefiderocol
J01DI54 Ceftolozane and beta-lactamase inhibitor
J01DI55 Sulopenem and probenecid

== J01E Sulfonamides and trimethoprim ==
Subgroups J01EA–E are only included in the human ATC classification.

=== J01EA Trimethoprim and derivatives ===
J01EA01 Trimethoprim
J01EA02 Brodimoprim
J01EA03 Iclaprim

=== J01EB Short-acting sulfonamides ===
J01EB01 Sulfaisodimidine
J01EB02 Sulfamethizole
J01EB03 Sulfadimidine
J01EB04 Sulfapyridine
J01EB05 Sulfafurazole
J01EB06 Sulfanilamide
J01EB07 Sulfathiazole
J01EB08 Sulfathiourea
J01EB20 Combinations

=== J01EC Intermediate-acting sulfonamides ===
J01EC01 Sulfamethoxazole
J01EC02 Sulfadiazine
J01EC03 Sulfamoxole
J01EC20 Combinations

=== J01ED Long-acting sulfonamides ===
J01ED01 Sulfadimethoxine
J01ED02 Sulfalene
J01ED03 Sulfametomidine
J01ED04 Sulfametoxydiazine
J01ED05 Sulfamethoxypyridazine
J01ED06 Sulfaperin
J01ED07 Sulfamerazine
J01ED08 Sulfaphenazole
J01ED09 Sulfamazon
J01ED20 Combinations

=== J01EE Combinations of sulfonamides and trimethoprim, including derivatives ===
J01EE01 Sulfamethoxazole and trimethoprim
J01EE02 Sulfadiazine and trimethoprim
J01EE03 Sulfametrole and trimethoprim
J01EE04 Sulfamoxole and trimethoprim
J01EE05 Sulfadimidine and trimethoprim
J01EE06 Sulfadiazine and tetroxoprim
J01EE07 Sulfamerazine and trimethoprim

=== QJ01EQ Sulfonamides ===
QJ01EQ01 Sulfapyrazole
QJ01EQ02 Sulfamethizole
QJ01EQ03 Sulfadimidine
QJ01EQ04 Sulfapyridine
QJ01EQ05 Sulfafurazole
QJ01EQ06 Sulfanilamide
QJ01EQ07 Sulfathiazole
QJ01EQ08 Sulfaphenazole
QJ01EQ09 Sulfadimethoxine
QJ01EQ10 Sulfadiazine
QJ01EQ11 Sulfamethoxazole
QJ01EQ12 Sulfachlorpyridazine
QJ01EQ13 Sulfadoxine
QJ01EQ14 Sulfatroxazol
QJ01EQ15 Sulfamethoxypyridazine
QJ01EQ16 Sulfazuinoxaline
QJ01EQ17 Sulfamerazine
QJ01EQ18 Sulfamonomethoxine
QJ01EQ19 Sulfalene
QJ01EQ21 Sulfacetamide
QJ01EQ30 Combinations of sulfonamides
QJ01EQ59 Sulfadimethoxine, combinations

=== QJ01EW Combinations of sulfonamides and trimethoprim, including derivatives ===
QJ01EW03 Sulfadimidine and trimethoprim
QJ01EW09 Sulfadimethoxine and trimethoprim
QJ01EW10 Sulfadiazine and trimethoprim
QJ01EW11 Sulfamethoxazole and trimethoprime
QJ01EW12 Sulfachlorpyridazine and trimethoprim
QJ01EW13 Sulfadoxine and trimethoprim
QJ01EW14 Sulfatroxazol and trimethoprim
QJ01EW15 Sulfamethoxypyridazine and trimethoprim
QJ01EW16 Sulfaquinoxaline and trimethoprim
QJ01EW17 Sulfamonomethoxine and trimethoprim
QJ01EW18 Sulfamerazine and trimethoprim
QJ01EW19 Sulfadimethoxine and ormetoprim
QJ01EW30 Combinations of sulfonamides and trimethoprim

== J01F Macrolides, lincosamides and streptogramins ==
=== J01FA Macrolides ===
J01FA01 Erythromycin
J01FA02 Spiramycin
J01FA03 Midecamycin
J01FA05 Oleandomycin
J01FA06 Roxithromycin
J01FA07 Josamycin
J01FA08 Troleandomycin
J01FA09 Clarithromycin
J01FA10 Azithromycin
J01FA11 Miocamycin
J01FA12 Rokitamycin
J01FA13 Dirithromycin
J01FA14 Flurithromycin
J01FA15 Telithromycin
J01FA16 Solithromycin
J01FA17 Nafithromycin
QJ01FA90 Tylosin
QJ01FA91 Tilmicosin
QJ01FA92 Tylvalosin
QJ01FA93 Kitasamycin
QJ01FA94 Tulathromycin
QJ01FA95 Gamithromycin
QJ01FA96 Tildipirosin
QJ01FA99 Macrolides, combinations with other substances

=== J01FF Lincosamides ===
J01FF01 Clindamycin
J01FF02 Lincomycin
QJ01FF52 Lincomycin, combinations

=== J01FG Streptogramins ===
J01FG01 Pristinamycin
J01FG02 Quinupristin/dalfopristin
QJ01FG90 Virginiamycin

== J01G Aminoglycoside antibacterials ==
=== J01GA Streptomycins ===
J01GA01 Streptomycin
J01GA02 Streptoduocin
QJ01GA90 Dihydrostreptomycin
QJ01GA99 Combinations of streptomycins

=== J01GB Other aminoglycosides ===
J01GB01 Tobramycin
J01GB03 Gentamicin
J01GB04 Kanamycin
J01GB05 Neomycin
J01GB06 Amikacin
J01GB07 Netilmicin
J01GB08 Sisomicin
J01GB09 Dibekacin
J01GB10 Ribostamycin
J01GB11 Isepamicin
J01GB12 Arbekacin
J01GB13 Bekanamycin
J01GB14 Plazomicin
QJ01GB90 Apramycin
QJ01GB91 Framycetin
QJ01GB92 Paromomycin

== J01M Quinolone antibacterials ==
In ATCvet, this subgroup is named "QJ01M Quinolone and quinoxaline antibacterials".

=== J01MA Fluoroquinolones ===
J01MA01 Ofloxacin
J01MA02 Ciprofloxacin
J01MA03 Pefloxacin
J01MA04 Enoxacin
J01MA05 Temafloxacin
J01MA06 Norfloxacin
J01MA07 Lomefloxacin
J01MA08 Fleroxacin
J01MA09 Sparfloxacin
J01MA10 Rufloxacin
J01MA11 Grepafloxacin
J01MA12 Levofloxacin
J01MA13 Trovafloxacin
J01MA14 Moxifloxacin
J01MA15 Gemifloxacin
J01MA16 Gatifloxacin
J01MA17 Prulifloxacin
J01MA18 Pazufloxacin
J01MA19 Garenoxacin
J01MA21 Sitafloxacin
J01MA22 Tosufloxacin
J01MA23 Delafloxacin
J01MA24 Levonadifloxacin
J01MA25 Lascufloxacin
QJ01MA90 Enrofloxacin
QJ01MA92 Danofloxacin
QJ01MA93 Marbofloxacin
QJ01MA94 Difloxacin
QJ01MA95 Orbifloxacin
QJ01MA96 Ibafloxacin
QJ01MA97 Pradofloxacin
QJ01MA98 Sarafloxacin

=== J01MB Other quinolones ===
J01MB01 Rosoxacin
J01MB02 Nalidixic acid
J01MB03 Piromidic acid
J01MB04 Pipemidic acid
J01MB05 Oxolinic acid
J01MB06 Cinoxacin
J01MB07 Flumequine
J01MB08 Nemonoxacin

=== QJ01MQ Quinoxalines ===
QJ01MQ01 Olaquindox

== J01R Combinations of antibacterials ==
=== J01RA Combinations of antibacterials ===
J01RA01 Penicillins, combinations with other antibacterials
J01RA02 Sulfonamides, combinations with other antibacterials (excluding trimethoprim)
J01RA03 Cefuroxime and metronidazole
J01RA04 Spiramycin and metronidazole
J01RA05 Levofloxacin and ornidazole
J01RA06 Cefepime and amikacin
J01RA07 Azithromycin, fluconazole and secnidazole
J01RA08 Tetracycline and oleandomycin
J01RA09 Ofloxacin and ornidazole
J01RA10 Ciprofloxacin and metronidazole
J01RA11 Ciprofloxacin and tinidazole
J01RA12 Ciprofloxacin and ornidazole
J01RA13 Norfloxacin and tinidazole
J01RA14 Norfloxacin and metronidazole
J01RA15 Cefixime and ornidazole
J01RA16 Cefixime and azithromycin
J01RA17 Ofloxacin and nitazoxanide
J01RA18 Ofloxacin and tinidazole
J01RA19 Tetracycline and nystatin
QJ01RA80 Nitrofuran derivatives, combinations with other antibacterials
QJ01RA90 Tetracyclines, combinations with other antibacterials
QJ01RA91 Macrolides, combinations with other antibacterials
QJ01RA92 Amphenicols, combinations with other antibacterials
QJ01RA94 Lincosamides, combinations with other antibacterials
QJ01RA95 Polymyxins, combinations with other antibacterials
QJ01RA96 Quinolones, combinations with other antibacterials
QJ01RA97 Aminoglycosides, combinations with other antibacterials

=== QJ01RV Combinations of antibacterials and other substances ===
QJ01RV01 Antibacterials and corticosteroids

== J01X Other antibacterials ==
=== J01XA Glycopeptide antibacterials ===
J01XA01 Vancomycin
J01XA02 Teicoplanin
J01XA03 Telavancin
J01XA04 Dalbavancin
J01XA05 Oritavancin

=== J01XB Polymyxins ===
J01XB01 Colistin
J01XB02 Polymyxin B

=== J01XC Steroid antibacterials ===
J01XC01 Fusidic acid

=== J01XD Imidazole derivatives ===
J01XD01 Metronidazole
J01XD02 Tinidazole
J01XD03 Ornidazole

=== J01XE Nitrofuran derivatives ===
J01XE01 Nitrofurantoin
J01XE02 Nifurtoinol
J01XE03 Furazidin
J01XE51 Nitrofurantoin, combinations
QJ01XE90 Furazolidine
QJ01XE91 Nifurpirinol

=== QJ01XQ Pleuromutilins ===
QJ01XQ01 Tiamulin
QJ01XQ02 Valnemulin

=== J01XX Other antibacterials ===
J01XX01 Fosfomycin
J01XX02 Xibornol
J01XX03 Clofoctol
J01XX04 Spectinomycin
J01XX05 Methenamine
J01XX06 Mandelic acid
J01XX07 Nitroxoline
J01XX08 Linezolid
J01XX09 Daptomycin
J01XX10 Bacitracin
J01XX11 Tedizolid
J01XX12 Lefamulin
J01XX13 Gepotidacin
QJ01XX55 Methenamine, combinations
QJ01XX93 Furaltadone
QJ01XX95 Novobiocin
