= C18H26O =

The molecular formula C_{18}H_{26}O (molar mass: 258.40 g/mol, exact mass: 258.1984 u) may refer to:

- Galaxolide (HHCB)
- Xibornol
