= C12H14N4O2S =

The molecular formula C_{12}H_{14}N_{4}O_{2}S (molar mass: 278.33 g/mol, exact mass: 278.0837 u) may refer to:

- Sulfadimidine, or sulfamethazine
- Sulfisomidine
