= C17H19N5O6S2 =

The molecular formula C_{17}H_{19}N_{5}O_{6}S_{2} (molar mass: 453.49 g/mol) may refer to:

- Cefcapene
- Cefovecin
