= C11H12N4O2S =

The molecular formula C_{11}H_{12}N_{4}O_{2}S (molar mass: 264.304 g/mol, exact mass: 264.0681 u) may refer to:

- Sulfamerazine
- Sulfaperin
