= C18H18N6O5S2 =

The molecular formula C_{18}H_{18}N_{6}O_{5}S_{2} (molar mass: 462.505 g/mol) may refer to:

- Cefamandole
- Cefatrizine
