= C11H13N3O3S =

The molecular formula C_{11}H_{13}N_{3}O_{3}S (molar mass: 267.30 g/mol, exact mass: 267.0678 u) may refer to:

- Sulfafurazole, or sulfisoxazole
- Sulfamoxole
