= C41H67NO15 =

The molecular formula C_{41}H_{67}NO_{15} (molar mass: 813.968 g/mol, exact mass: 813.4511 u) may refer to:

- Midecamycin
- Troleandomycin (TAO)
