= Propicillin =

Chemical compound

Clinical data
- AHFS/Drugs.com: International Drug Names
- Routes of administration: Oral
- ATC code: J01CE03 (WHO)

Identifiers
- IUPAC name: (2S,5R,6R)-3,3-dimethyl-7-oxo-6-[(2-phenoxybutanoyl)amino]-4-thia-1-azabicyclo[3.2.0]heptane-2-carboxylic acid
- CAS Number: 551-27-9
- PubChem CID: 92879
- ChemSpider: 83843
- UNII: 8X1R260V33
- KEGG: C13110
- ChEBI: CHEBI:52429
- ChEMBL: ChEMBL1477112
- CompTox Dashboard (EPA): DTXSID3046291
- ECHA InfoCard: 100.008.178

Chemical and physical data
- Formula: C_{18}H_{22}N_{2}O_{5}S
- Molar mass: 378.44 g·mol^{−1}
- 3D model (JSmol): Interactive image
- SMILES: CCC(C(=O)N[C@H]1[C@@H]2N(C1=O)[C@H](C(S2)(C)C)C(=O)O)OC3=CC=CC=C3
- InChI: InChI=1S/C18H22N2O5S/c1-4-11(25-10-8-6-5-7-9-10)14(21)19-12-15(22)20-13(17(23)24)18(2,3)26-16(12)20/h5-9,11-13,16H,4H2,1-3H3,(H,19,21)(H,23,24)/t11?,12-,13+,16-/m1/s1; Key:HOCWPKXKMNXINF-XQERAMJGSA-N

Propicillin is a penicillin. Properties are similar to benzylpenicillin particularly used in streptococcal infections, not resistant to penicillinase. It is acid resistant and can be used orally as the potassium salt.
