= Rokitamycin =

Type of antibiotic chemical

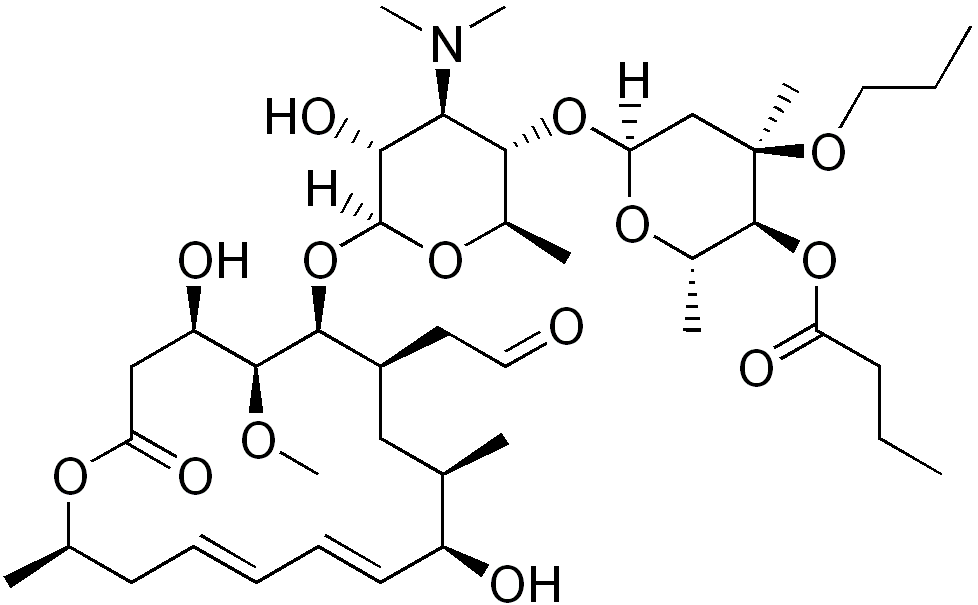

Clinical data
- AHFS/Drugs.com: International Drug Names
- ATC code: J01FA12 (WHO)

Identifiers
- IUPAC name: (2S,3S,4R,6S)-6-{[(2R,3S,4R,5R,6S)-6-{[(4R,5S,6S,7R,9R,10R,11E,13E,16R)-4,10-dihydroxy-5-methoxy-9,16-dimethyl-2-oxo-7-(2-oxoethyl)-1-oxacyclohexadeca-11,13-dien-6-yl]oxy}-4-(dimethylamino)-5-hydroxy-2-methyloxan-3-yl]oxy}-2,4-dimethyl-4-propoxyoxan-3-yl butanoate
- CAS Number: 74014-51-0
- PubChem CID: 5282211
- ChemSpider: 4445397
- UNII: ZPT03UEM0E
- ChEMBL: ChEMBL1908350
- CompTox Dashboard (EPA): DTXSID6023521

Chemical and physical data
- Formula: C_{42}H_{71}NO_{14}
- Molar mass: 814.023 g·mol^{−1}
- 3D model (JSmol): Interactive image
- Melting point: 116 °C (241 °F)
- Solubility in water: Insoluble in water; Very soluble in chloroform and methanol; Almost completely (>99.5%) in ethanol and acetonitrile. mg/mL (20 °C)
- SMILES: O=CC[C@H]3C[C@@H](C)[C@@H](O)/C=C/C=C/C[C@H](OC(=O)C[C@@H](O)[C@H](OC)[C@H]3O[C@@H]2O[C@@H]([C@@H](O[C@@H]1O[C@H]([C@H](OC(=O)CCC)[C@](OC(=O)CC)(C1)C)C)[C@H](N(C)C)[C@H]2O)C)C
- InChI: InChI=1S/C42H69NO15/c1-11-16-32(48)55-40-27(6)53-34(23-42(40,7)58-31(47)12-2)56-37-26(5)54-41(36(50)35(37)43(8)9)57-38-28(19-20-44)21-24(3)29(45)18-15-13-14-17-25(4)52-33(49)22-30(46)39(38)51-10/h13-15,18,20,24-30,34-41,45-46,50H,11-12,16-17,19,21-23H2,1-10H3/b14-13+,18-15+/t24-,25-,26-,27+,28+,29+,30-,34+,35-,36-,37-,38+,39+,40+,41+,42-/m1/s1; Key:VYWWNRMSAPEJLS-MDWYKHENSA-N

Rokitamycin is a macrolide antibiotic synthesized from strains of Streptomyces kitasatoensis.
