= Ceftezole =

Chemical compound

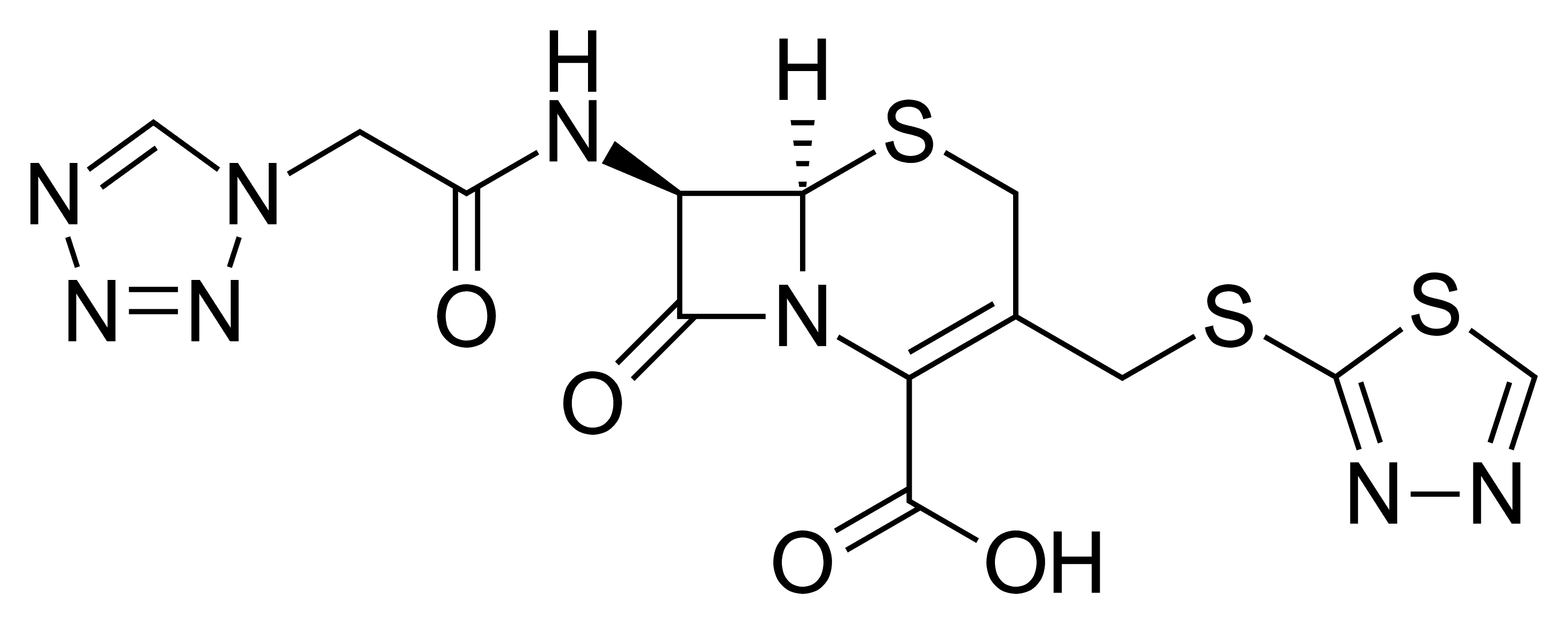

Clinical data
- ATC code: J01DB12 (WHO)

Identifiers
- IUPAC name: (6R,7R)-8-oxo-7-{[2-(tetrazol-1-yl)acetyl]amino}- 3-(1,3,4-thiadiazol-2-ylsulfanylmethyl)-5-thia- 1-azabicyclo[4.2.0]oct-2-ene-2-carboxylic acid
- CAS Number: 26973-24-0
- PubChem CID: 65755
- ChemSpider: 59178
- UNII: 2Z86SYP11W
- KEGG: D07656
- ChEMBL: ChEMBL1697829
- CompTox Dashboard (EPA): DTXSID0022771
- ECHA InfoCard: 100.113.941

Chemical and physical data
- Formula: C_{13}H_{12}N_{8}O_{4}S_{3}
- Molar mass: 440.47 g·mol^{−1}
- 3D model (JSmol): Interactive image
- SMILES: O=C2N1/C(=C(\CS[C@@H]1[C@@H]2NC(=O)Cn3nnnc3)CSc4nncs4)C(=O)O
- InChI: InChI=1S/C13H12N8O4S3/c22-7(1-20-4-14-18-19-20)16-8-10(23)21-9(12(24)25)6(2-26-11(8)21)3-27-13-17-15-5-28-13/h4-5,8,11H,1-3H2,(H,16,22)(H,24,25)/t8-,11-/m1/s1; Key:DZMVCVMFETWNIU-LDYMZIIASA-N

Ceftezole (or ceftezol) is a semisynthetic first-generation cephalosporin antibiotic.

Ceftezole binds to and inactivates penicillin-binding proteins (PBPs) located on the inner membrane of the bacterial cell wall. PBPs are enzymes involved in the terminal stages of assembling the bacterial cell wall and in reshaping the cell wall during growth and division. Inactivation of PBPs interferes with the cross-linkage of peptidoglycan chains necessary for bacterial cell wall strength and rigidity. This results in the weakening of the bacterial cell wall and causes cell lysis.

Ceftezole is having (1,3,4-thiadiazol-2-ylsulfanyl)methyl and [2-(1H-tetrazol-1-yl)acetamido side groups located at positions 3 and 7 respectively. It is a cephalosporin and a member of thiadiazoles.

== Note ==
- This article incorporates public domain material from Ceftezole (compound). National Center for Biotechnology Information - the National Library of Medicine - PubChem®.
