= Pefloxacin =

Antibiotic

Clinical data
- ATC code: J01MA03 (WHO)

Pharmacokinetic data
- Bioavailability: 100%
- Protein binding: 20–30%
- Metabolism: Hepatic
- Elimination half-life: 8.6 hours
- Excretion: Mostly renal, also biliary

Identifiers
- IUPAC name: 1-ethyl-6-fluoro-7-(4-methylpiperazin-1-yl)-4-oxo-quinoline-3-carboxylic acid
- CAS Number: 70458-92-3
- PubChem CID: 51081
- DrugBank: DB00487
- ChemSpider: 46291
- UNII: 2H52Z9F2Q5
- KEGG: D02306
- ChEBI: CHEBI:50199
- ChEMBL: ChEMBL267648
- CompTox Dashboard (EPA): DTXSID3048493
- ECHA InfoCard: 100.067.807

Chemical and physical data
- Formula: C_{17}H_{20}FN_{3}O_{3}
- Molar mass: 333.363 g·mol^{−1}
- 3D model (JSmol): Interactive image
- SMILES: O=C(O)\C2=C\N(c1cc(c(F)cc1C2=O)N3CCN(C)CC3)CC
- InChI: InChI=1S/C17H20FN3O3/c1-3-20-10-12(17(23)24)16(22)11-8-13(18)15(9-14(11)20)21-6-4-19(2)5-7-21/h8-10H,3-7H2,1-2H3,(H,23,24); Key:FHFYDNQZQSQIAI-UHFFFAOYSA-N

Pefloxacin is a quinolone antibiotic used to treat bacterial infections. Pefloxacin has not been approved for use in the United States.

== History ==
Pefloxacin was developed in 1979 and approved in France for human use in 1985.

== Licensed uses ==
- Uncomplicated gonococcal urethritis in males.
- Bacterial infections in the gastrointestinal system.
- Genitourinary tract infections.
- Gonorrhoea, however, this use is no longer effective due to bacterial resistance.

Pefloxacin has been increasingly used as a veterinary medicine to treat microbial infections.

== Mode of action ==
Pefloxacin is a broad-spectrum antibiotic that is active against both Gram-positive and Gram-negative bacteria. It functions by inhibiting DNA gyrase, a type II topoisomerase, and topoisomerase IV, which is an enzyme necessary to separate, replicated DNA, thereby inhibiting cell division.

== Adverse effects ==
Tendinitis and rupture, usually of the Achilles tendon, are class-effects of the fluoroquinolones, most frequently reported with pefloxacin. The estimated risk of tendon damage during pefloxacin therapy has been estimated by the French authorities in 2000 to be 1 case per 23,130 treatment days as compared to ciprofloxacin where it has been estimated to be 1 case per 779,600.
