= Brodimoprim =

Chemical compound

Clinical data
- ATC code: J01EA02 (WHO)

Identifiers
- IUPAC name: 5-[(4-Bromo-3,5-dimethoxyphenyl)methyl]pyrimidine-2,4-diamine
- CAS Number: 56518-41-3
- PubChem CID: 68760
- ChemSpider: 62004
- UNII: V1YC7T6LLI
- KEGG: D07238
- ChEBI: CHEBI:131726
- ChEMBL: ChEMBL31891
- CompTox Dashboard (EPA): DTXSID20205070
- ECHA InfoCard: 100.054.745

Chemical and physical data
- Formula: C_{13}H_{15}BrN_{4}O_{2}
- Molar mass: 339.193 g·mol^{−1}
- 3D model (JSmol): Interactive image
- Melting point: 225 to 228 °C (437 to 442 °F)
- SMILES: Brc1c(OC)cc(cc1OC)Cc2cnc(nc2N)N
- InChI: InChI=1S/C13H15BrN4O2/c1-19-9-4-7(5-10(20-2)11(9)14)3-8-6-17-13(16)18-12(8)15/h4-6H,3H2,1-2H3,(H4,15,16,17,18); Key:BFCRRLMMHNLSCP-UHFFFAOYSA-N

Brodimoprim is a structural derivative of trimethoprim. In brodimoprim, the 4-methoxy group of trimethoprim is replaced with a bromine atom.

As trimethoprim, brodimoprim is a selective inhibitor of bacterial dihydrofolate reductase.

== Synthesis ==
Thieme ChemDrug Synthesis: Patent: Alternate aldehyde synthesis:

The treatment of Dimethyl 2,6-dimethoxybenzene-1,4-dicarboxylate [16849-68-6] (1) with hydroxylamine in PPA gives the hydroxamide, PC12398304 (2). Further treatment with PPA led to methyl 4-amino-3,5-dimethoxybenzoate [56066-25-2] (3). Sandmeyer reaction led to Methyl 4-bromo-3,5-dimethoxybenzoate [26050-64-6] (4). Saponification of the ester formed 4-Bromo-3,5-dimethoxybenzoic acid [56518-42-4] (5). Halogenation with thionyl chloride gave 4-Bromo-3,5-dimethoxybenzoyl chloride [56518-43-5] (6). Rosenmund reduction gave 4-Bromo-3,5-dimethoxybenzaldehyde [31558-40-4] (7). {Alternatively DIBAL meant that FGI from ester to aldehyde was accomplished in only 1 step}. Knoevenagel condensation with 3-Methoxypropionitrile [110-67-8] (8) afforded [56518-39-9] (9). Finally, condensation with Guanidine [113-00-8] completed the synthesis of Brodimoprim (10).
