= Cefazedone =

Chemical compound

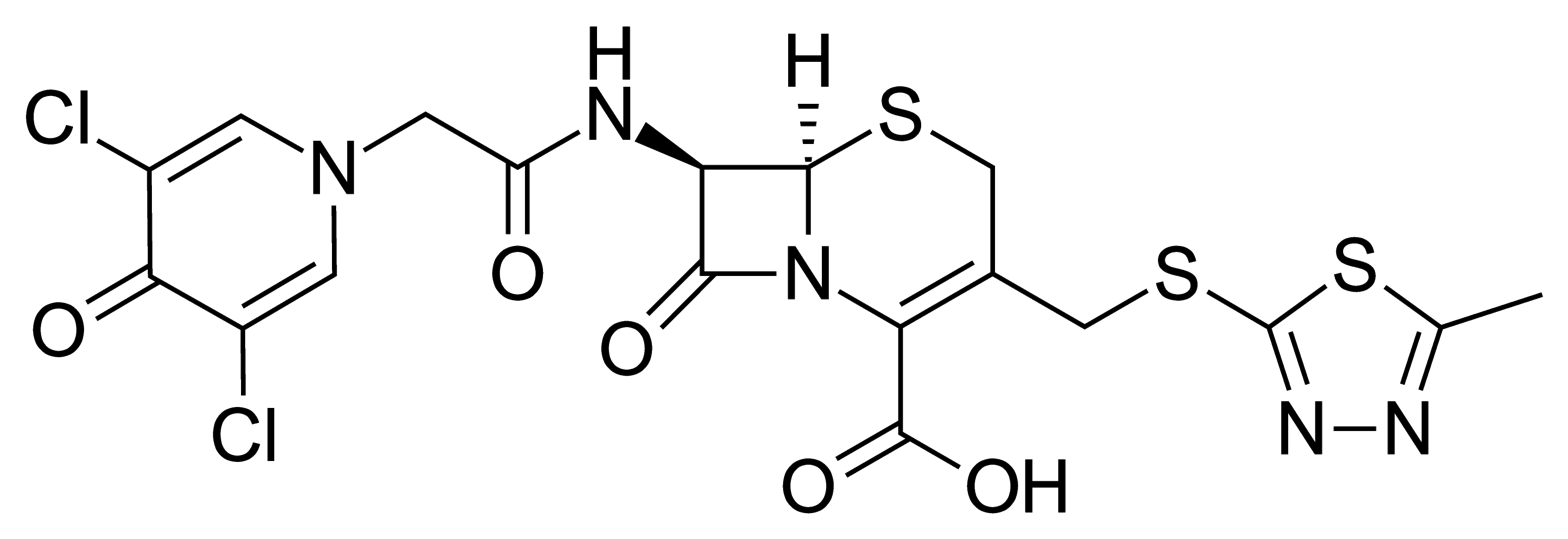

Clinical data
- ATC code: J01DB06 (WHO)

Identifiers
- IUPAC name: (6R,7R)-7-{[2-(3,5-dichloro-4-oxopyridin-1-yl) acetyl]amino}-3-[(5-methyl-1,3,4-thiadiazol-2-yl) sulfanylmethyl]-8-oxo-5-thia-1-azabicyclo[4.2.0] oct-2-ene-2-carboxylic acid
- CAS Number: 56187-47-4
- PubChem CID: 71736
- ChemSpider: 64780
- UNII: 7Y86X0D799
- KEGG: D07237
- ChEBI: CHEBI:131731
- ChEMBL: ChEMBL2107636
- CompTox Dashboard (EPA): DTXSID50204733
- ECHA InfoCard: 100.121.805

Chemical and physical data
- Formula: C_{18}H_{15}Cl_{2}N_{5}O_{5}S_{3}
- Molar mass: 548.43 g·mol^{−1}
- 3D model (JSmol): Interactive image
- SMILES: O=C2N1/C(=C(\CS[C@@H]1[C@@H]2NC(=O)CN/3/C=C(/Cl)C(=O)C(\Cl)=C\3)CSc4nnc(s4)C)C(=O)O
- InChI: InChI=1S/C18H15Cl2N5O5S3/c1-7-22-23-18(33-7)32-6-8-5-31-16-12(15(28)25(16)13(8)17(29)30)21-11(26)4-24-2-9(19)14(27)10(20)3-24/h2-3,12,16H,4-6H2,1H3,(H,21,26)(H,29,30)/t12-,16-/m1/s1; Key:VTLCNEGVSVJLDN-MLGOLLRUSA-N

Cefazedone is a cephalosporin antibiotic.
