= Miocamycin =

Chemical compound

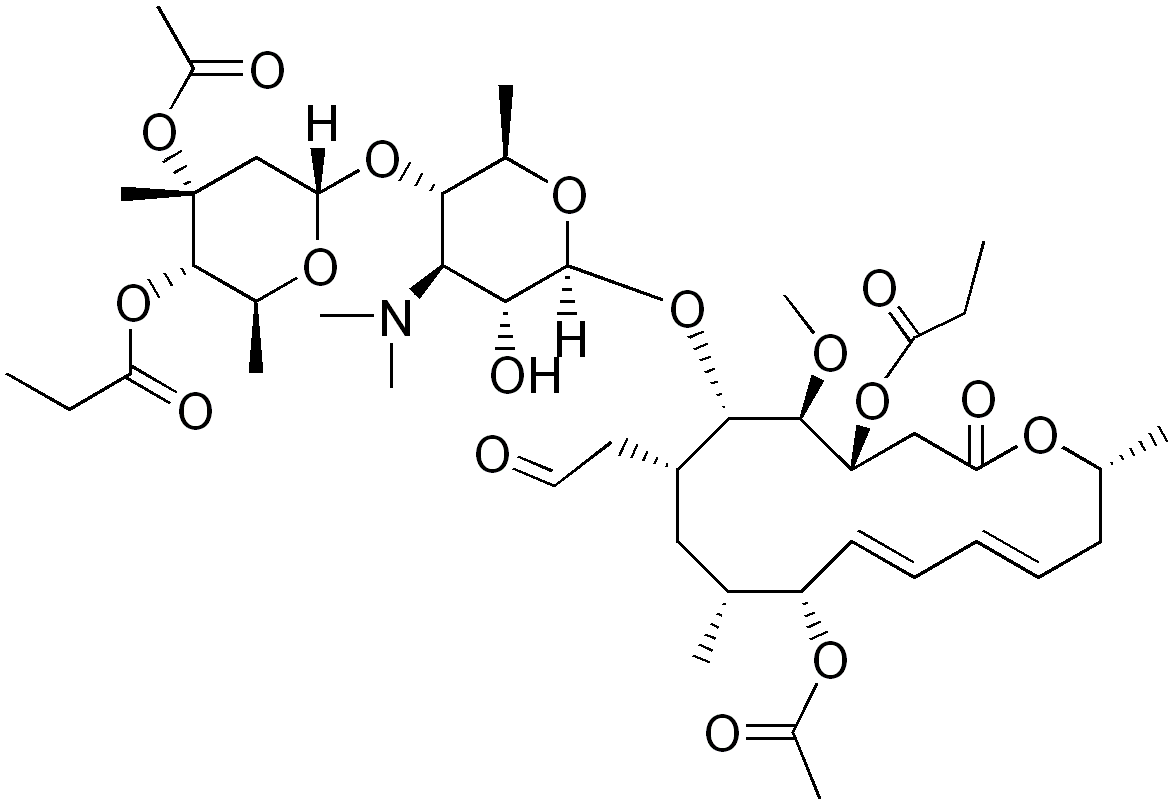

Clinical data
- AHFS/Drugs.com: International Drug Names
- ATC code: J01FA11 (WHO)

Identifiers
- IUPAC name: (2S,3S,4R,6S)-6-{[(2R,3S,4R,5R,6S)-6-{[(4S,5R,6S,7R,9R,10R,11E,13E,16R)-10-(acetyloxy)-5-methoxy-9,16-dimethyl-2-oxo-7-(2-oxoethyl)-4-propoxy-1-oxacyclohexadeca-11,13-dien-6-yl]oxy}-4-(dimethylamino)-5-hydroxy-2-methyloxan-3-yl]oxy}-2,4-dimethyl-3-propoxyoxan-4-yl acetate
- CAS Number: 55881-07-7
- PubChem CID: 6475694
- ChemSpider: 16735908
- UNII: 3T48CPS7U2
- ChEMBL: ChEMBL1091024
- CompTox Dashboard (EPA): DTXSID60905087
- ECHA InfoCard: 100.054.418

Chemical and physical data
- Formula: C_{45}H_{71}NO_{17}
- Molar mass: 898.053 g·mol^{−1}
- 3D model (JSmol): Interactive image
- Melting point: 220 °C (428 °F)
- Solubility in water: Slightly soluble in water; Soluble in methanol, acetone and chloroform. mg/mL (20 °C)
- SMILES: CC(=O)O[C@H]3/C=C/C=C/C[C@@H](C)OC(=O)C[C@@H](OC(=O)CC)[C@H](OC)[C@@H](O[C@@H]2O[C@H](C)[C@@H](O[C@H]1C[C@@](C)(OC(C)=O)[C@@H](OC(=O)CC)[C@H](C)O1)[C@H](N(C)C)[C@H]2O)[C@@H](CC=O)C[C@H]3C
- InChI: InChI=1S/C45H71NO17/c1-13-34(50)59-33-23-36(52)55-26(4)18-16-15-17-19-32(58-29(7)48)25(3)22-31(20-21-47)41(42(33)54-12)62-44-39(53)38(46(10)11)40(27(5)57-44)61-37-24-45(9,63-30(8)49)43(28(6)56-37)60-35(51)14-2/h15-17,19,21,25-28,31-33,37-44,53H,13-14,18,20,22-24H2,1-12H3/b16-15+,19-17+/t25-,26-,27-,28+,31+,32+,33-,37+,38-,39-,40-,41+,42+,43+,44+,45-/m1/s1; Key:GQNZGCARKRHPOH-RQIKCTSVSA-N

Miocamycin is a macrolide antibiotic. It has a spectrum activity similar to that of Erythromycin, but shows higher antimicrobial effect against certain bacteria including Legionella pneumophila (the causative agent of Legionnaires' Disease), Mycoplasma hominis, and Ureaplasma urealyticum. In-vivo studies have further expounded on Miocamycin's efficacy, reporting that the medication is more effective than in-vitro data suggests.
