= Trimethoprim/sulfadiazine =

Combination drug

Combination of
- Trimethoprim: antibiotic
- Sulfadiazine: antibiotic

Clinical data
- Trade names: Tucoprim; Tribrissen
- ATC code: J01EE

Identifiers
- CAS Number: 39474-58-3

Trimethoprim/sulfadiazine (TMP/SDZ) is a combination drug composed of trimethoprim and sulfadiazine used in the treatment of bacterial infections of animals, particularly horses.
