= Sulfaphenazole =

Chemical compound

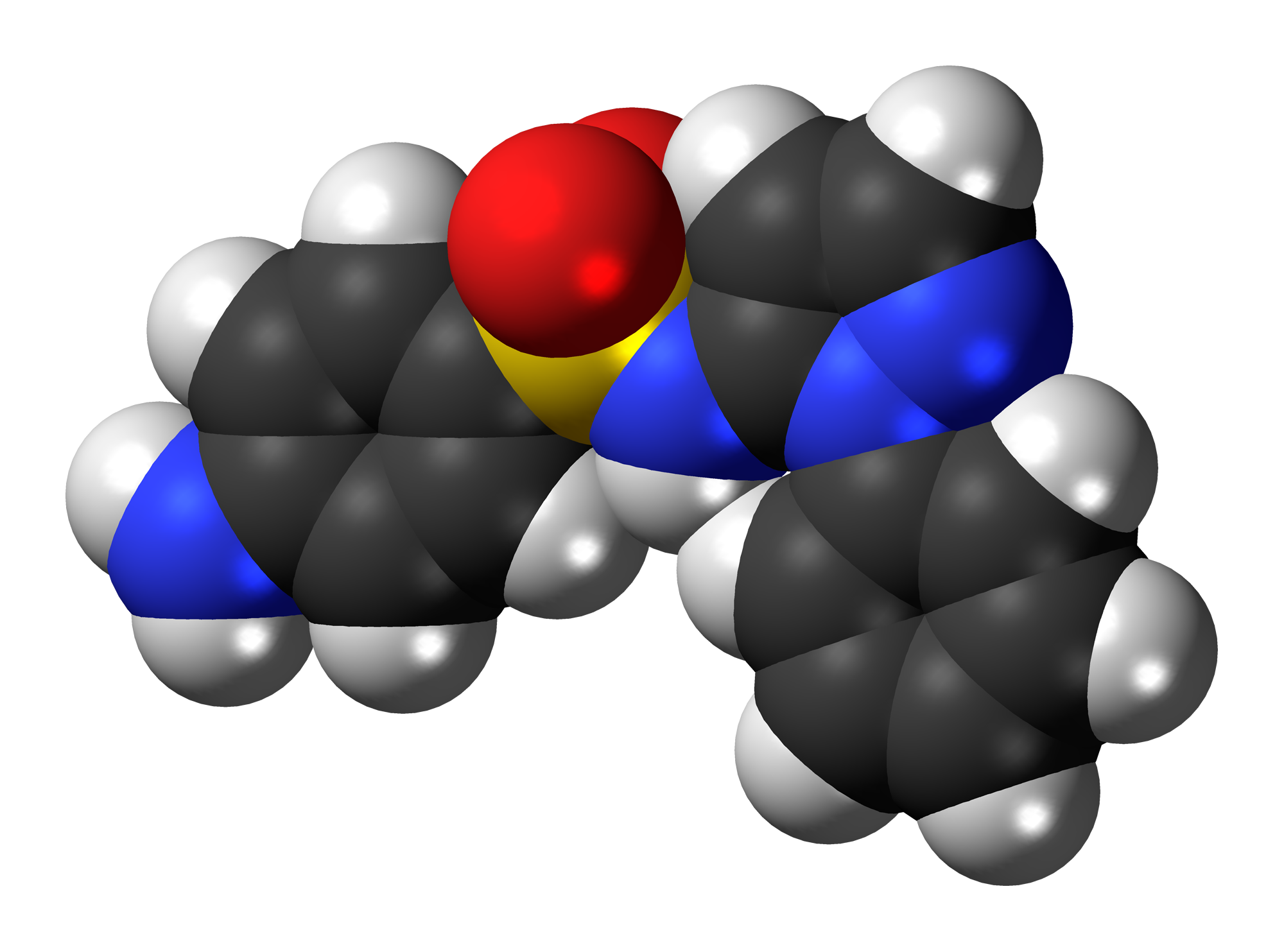

Clinical data
- AHFS/Drugs.com: International Drug Names
- ATC code: J01ED08 (WHO) S01AB05 (WHO) QJ01EQ08 (WHO)

Identifiers
- IUPAC name: 4-amino-N-(1-phenyl-1H-pyrazol-5-yl)benzenesulfonamide
- CAS Number: 526-08-9
- PubChem CID: 5335
- DrugBank: DB06729
- ChemSpider: 5144
- UNII: 0J8L4V3F81
- KEGG: D01954
- ChEMBL: ChEMBL1109
- CompTox Dashboard (EPA): DTXSID2044131
- ECHA InfoCard: 100.007.624

Chemical and physical data
- Formula: C_{15}H_{14}N_{4}O_{2}S
- Molar mass: 314.36 g·mol^{−1}
- 3D model (JSmol): Interactive image
- SMILES: O=S(=O)(c1ccc(N)cc1)Nc3ccnn3c2ccccc2
- InChI: InChI=1S/C15H14N4O2S/c16-12-6-8-14(9-7-12)22(20,21)18-15-10-11-17-19(15)13-4-2-1-3-5-13/h1-11,18H,16H2; Key:QWCJHSGMANYXCW-UHFFFAOYSA-N

Sulfaphenazole (or sulfafenazol) is a sulfonamide antibacterial.
