= Nafithromycin =

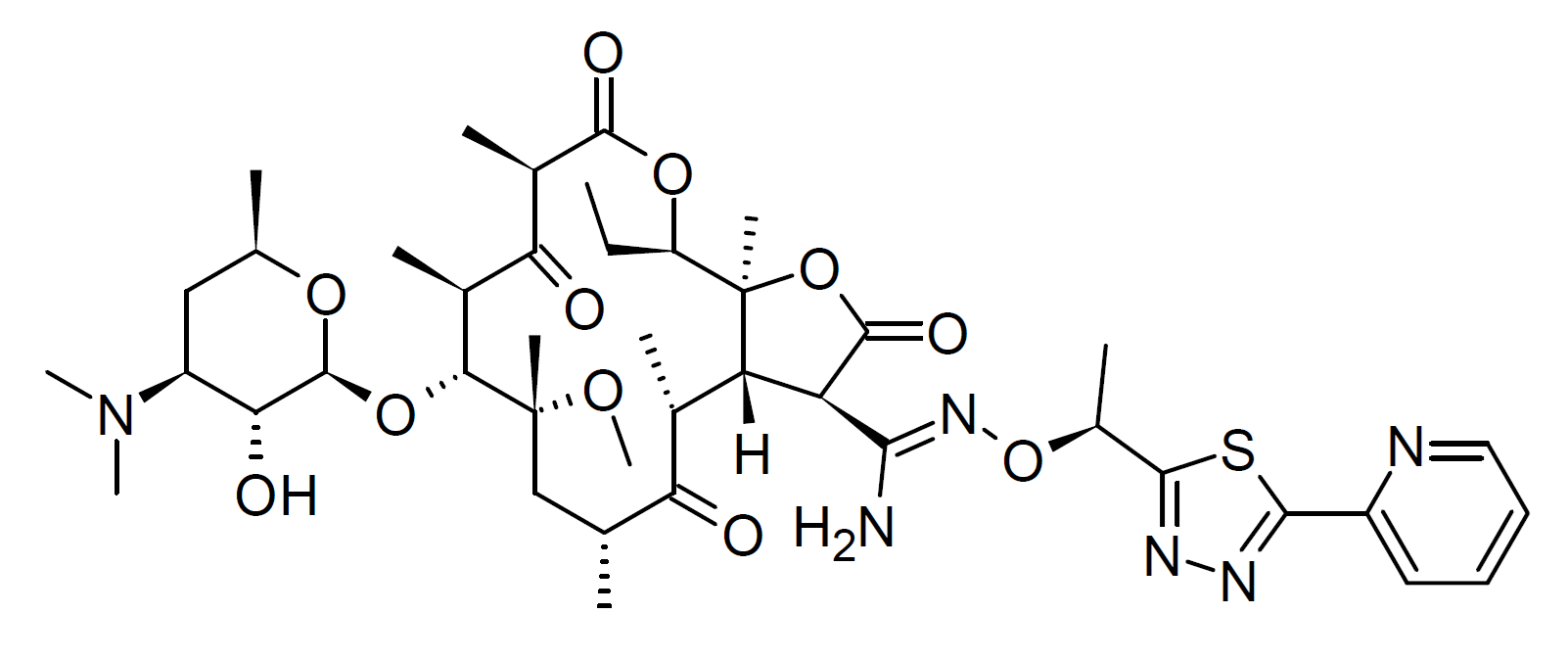

Clinical data
- Other names: WCK-4873
- ATC code: J01FA17 (WHO)

Identifiers
- IUPAC name: (1S,2R,5R,7R,8R,9R,11R,13R,14S,15R)-8-[(2S,3R,4S,6R)-4-(dimethylamino)-3-hydroxy-6-methyloxan-2-yl]oxy-2-ethyl-9-methoxy-1,5,7,9,11,13-hexamethyl-4,6,12,16-tetraoxo-N'-[(1S)-1-(5-pyridin-2-yl-1,3,4-thiadiazol-2-yl)ethoxy]-3,17-dioxabicyclo[12.3.0]heptadecane-15-carboximidamide
- CAS Number: 1691240-78-4
- PubChem CID: 117587595
- UNII: 75F74Y2R70
- KEGG: D13243

Chemical and physical data
- Formula: C_{42}H_{62}N_{6}O_{11}S
- Molar mass: 859.05 g·mol^{−1}
- 3D model (JSmol): Interactive image
- SMILES: CC[C@@H]1[C@@]2([C@@H]([C@H](C(=O)[C@@H](C[C@@]([C@@H]([C@H](C(=O)[C@H](C(=O)O1)C)C)O[C@H]3[C@@H]([C@H](C[C@H](O3)C)N(C)C)O)(C)OC)C)C)[C@@H](C(=O)O2)/C(=N/O[C@@H](C)C4=NN=C(S4)C5=CC=CC=N5)/N)C
- InChI: InChI=1S/C42H62N6O11S/c1-13-28-42(9)30(29(39(53)58-42)35(43)47-59-25(7)36-45-46-37(60-36)26-16-14-15-17-44-26)22(4)31(49)20(2)19-41(8,54-12)34(23(5)32(50)24(6)38(52)56-28)57-40-33(51)27(48(10)11)18-21(3)55-40/h14-17,20-25,27-30,33-34,40,51H,13,18-19H2,1-12H3,(H2,43,47)/t20-,21-,22-,23+,24-,25+,27+,28-,29-,30+,33-,34-,40+,41-,42-/m1/s1; Key:RLFCSBSRGRJFRO-QAOQTAGDSA-N

Nafithromycin is an experimental antibiotic medication for the treatment of pneumonia.
