= Bekanamycin =

Chemical compound

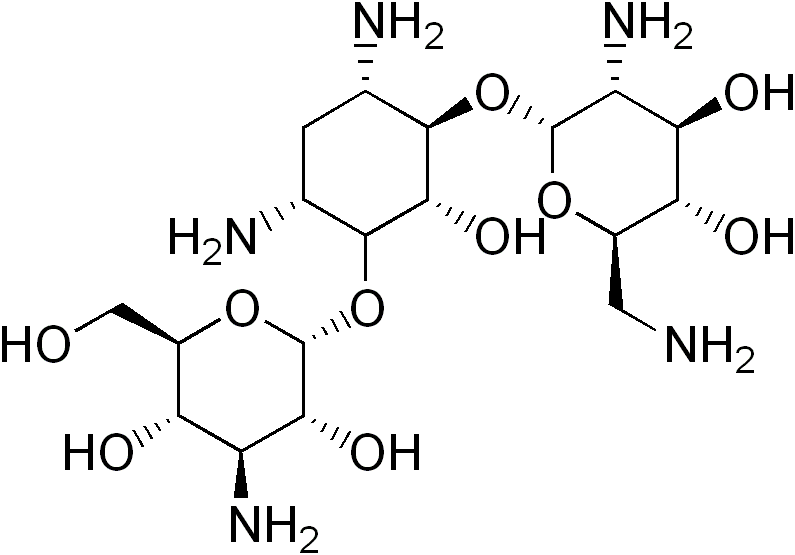

Clinical data
- AHFS/Drugs.com: International Drug Names
- ATC code: J01GB13 (WHO)

Legal status
- Legal status: In general: ℞ (Prescription only)

Identifiers
- IUPAC name: (2S,3R,4S,5S,6R)-4-amino-2-{[(2S,3R,4S,6R)-4,6-diamino-3-{[(2R,3R,4R,5S,6R)-3-amino-6-(aminomethyl)-4,5-dihydroxyoxan-2-yl]oxy}-2-hydroxycyclohexyl]oxy}-6-(hydroxymethyl)oxane-3,5-diol
- CAS Number: 4696-76-8
- PubChem CID: 439318
- ChemSpider: 388449
- UNII: 15JT14C3GI
- ChEBI: CHEBI:28098
- ChEMBL: ChEMBL176
- NIAID ChemDB: 005087
- CompTox Dashboard (EPA): DTXSID8023185
- ECHA InfoCard: 100.022.881

Chemical and physical data
- Formula: C_{18}H_{37}N_{5}O_{10}
- Molar mass: 483.519 g·mol^{−1}
- 3D model (JSmol): Interactive image
- SMILES: C1[C@@H]([C@H]([C@@H]([C@H]([C@@H]1N)O[C@@H]2[C@@H]([C@H]([C@@H]([C@H](O2)CO)O)N)O)O)O[C@@H]3[C@@H]([C@H]([C@@H]([C@H](O3)CN)O)O)N)N
- InChI: InChI=1S/C18H37N5O10/c19-2-6-11(26)12(27)9(23)17(30-6)32-15-4(20)1-5(21)16(14(15)29)33-18-13(28)8(22)10(25)7(3-24)31-18/h4-18,24-29H,1-3,19-23H2/t4-,5+,6+,7+,8-,9+,10+,11+,12+,13+,14-,15+,16-,17+,18+/m0/s1; Key:SKKLOUVUUNMCJE-FQSMHNGLSA-N

Bekanamycin (INN; kanamycin B) is an aminoglycoside antibiotic. It was discovered in 1957, along with Kanamycin A, though it was not identified and named until the next year, when it was studied independently. It was later found to be nearly identically efficacious as Kanamycin A, with the only limitation being lower efficacy towards Mycobacterium agents. Animal studies also showed that Bekanamycin was more toxic than Kanamycin A.
