= Penimepicycline =

Chemical compound

Clinical data
- Routes of administration: Oral, intramuscular
- ATC code: J01AA10 (WHO)

Identifiers
- CAS Number: 4599-60-4
- PubChem CID: 5464323
- ChemSpider: 16736440
- UNII: 3RGQ4B6E87
- KEGG: D07233
- ChEBI: CHEBI:75258
- CompTox Dashboard (EPA): DTXSID20905088
- ECHA InfoCard: 100.022.729

Chemical and physical data
- Formula: C_{45}H_{56}N_{6}O_{14}S
- Molar mass: 937.03 g·mol^{−1}
- 3D model (JSmol): Interactive image
- SMILES: O=C(O)[C@@H]2N3C(=O)[C@@H](NC(=O)COc1ccccc1)[C@H]3SC2(C)C.CN(C)[C@@H]2C(\O)=C(/C(=O)[C@@]3(O)C(/O)=C4/C(=O)c1c(O)cccc1[C@@](C)(O)C4C[C@@H]23)C(=O)NCN5CCN(CCO)CC5
- InChI: InChI=1S/C29H38N4O9.C16H18N2O5S/c1-28(41)15-5-4-6-18(35)19(15)23(36)20-16(28)13-17-22(31(2)3)24(37)21(26(39)29(17,42)25(20)38)27(40)30-14-33-9-7-32(8-10-33)11-12-34;1-16(2)12(15(21)22)18-13(20)11(14(18)24-16)17-10(19)8-23-9-6-4-3-5-7-9/h4-6,16-17,22,34-35,37-38,41-42H,7-14H2,1-3H3,(H,30,40);3-7,11-12,14H,8H2,1-2H3,(H,17,19)(H,21,22)/t16?,17-,22-,28+,29-;11-,12+,14-/m01/s1; Key:MEGKRPMNPGTIIG-FPAXJKHWSA-N

Penimepicycline (INN, also known as mepicycline penicillinate) is an antibiotic. It is the phenoxymethylpenicillinate salt of the tetracycline antibiotic pipacycline (mepicycline).
