= Ibafloxacin =

Chemical compound

Clinical data
- Trade names: Ibaflin
- AHFS/Drugs.com: International Drug Names
- ATCvet code: QJ01MA96 (WHO)

Legal status
- Legal status: CA: ℞-only; EU: Rx-only

Identifiers
- IUPAC name: 6,7-dihydro-5,8-dimethyl-9-fluoro-1-oxo-1H,5H-benzo[ij]quinolizine-2-carboxylic acid
- CAS Number: 91618-36-9
- PubChem CID: 71186
- ChemSpider: 64324
- UNII: 53VPK9R0T5
- KEGG: D04485
- CompTox Dashboard (EPA): DTXSID8057853

Chemical and physical data
- Formula: C_{15}H_{14}FNO_{3}
- Molar mass: 275.279 g·mol^{−1}
- 3D model (JSmol): Interactive image
- SMILES: Fc2cc1C(=O)/C(C(=O)O)=C\N3c1c(c2C)CCC3C
- InChI: InChI=1S/C15H14FNO3/c1-7-3-4-9-8(2)12(16)5-10-13(9)17(7)6-11(14(10)18)15(19)20/h5-7H,3-4H2,1-2H3,(H,19,20); Key:DXKRGNXUIRKXNR-UHFFFAOYSA-N

Ibafloxacin (INN) is a fluoroquinolone antibiotic drug formally approved for use in the European Union for veterinary medicine.
