= Penamecillin =

Chemical compound

Clinical data
- AHFS/Drugs.com: International Drug Names
- ATC code: J01CE06 (WHO)

Identifiers
- IUPAC name: (acetyloxy)methyl (2S,5R,6R)-3,3-dimethyl-7-oxo-6-[(phenylacetyl)amino]-4-thia-1-azabicyclo[3.2.0]heptane-2-carboxylate
- CAS Number: 983-85-7
- PubChem CID: 13795
- ChemSpider: 8426255
- UNII: H0P1YE5581
- KEGG: D05406
- ChEBI: CHEBI:131733
- CompTox Dashboard (EPA): DTXSID10243547
- ECHA InfoCard: 100.012.338

Chemical and physical data
- Formula: C_{19}H_{22}N_{2}O_{6}S
- Molar mass: 406.45 g·mol^{−1}
- 3D model (JSmol): Interactive image
- SMILES: CC(=O)OCOC(=O)[C@H]1C(S[C@H]2N1C(=O)[C@H]2NC(=O)CC3=CC=CC=C3)(C)C
- InChI: InChI=1S/C19H22N2O6S/c1-11(22)26-10-27-18(25)15-19(2,3)28-17-14(16(24)21(15)17)20-13(23)9-12-7-5-4-6-8-12/h4-8,14-15,17H,9-10H2,1-3H3,(H,20,23)/t14-,15+,17-/m1/s1; Key:NLOOMWLTUVBWAW-HLLBOEOZSA-N

Penamecillin, an acetoxymethyl ester of benzylpenicillin, is a prodrug processed to benzylpenicillin by esterases. It has no detectable teratogenic risk to the fetus.
