= Isepamicin =

Chemical compound

Clinical data
- Other names: Isepamycin (2S)-3-Amino-N-[(1R,2S,3S,4R,5S)-5-amino-4-[(3R,4S,5S,6R)-6-(aminomethyl)-3,4,5-trihydroxyoxan-2-yl]oxy-2-[(3R,4R,5R)-3,5-dihydroxy-5-methyl-4-methylaminooxan-2-yl]oxy-3-hydroxycyclohexyl]-2-hydroxypropanamide
- AHFS/Drugs.com: International Drug Names
- ATC code: J01GB11 (WHO)

Identifiers
- IUPAC name: (2S)-3-amino-N-((1R,2S,3S,4R,5S)-5-amino-4-[(6-amino-6-deoxy-D-glucopyranosyl)oxy]-2-{[3-deoxy-4-C-methyl-3-(methylamino)-L-arabinopyranosyl]oxy}-3-hydroxycyclohexyl)-2-hydroxypropanamide
- CAS Number: 58152-03-7
- PubChem CID: 3037209
- ChemSpider: 2301019
- UNII: G7K224460P
- ChEMBL: ChEMBL272080
- CompTox Dashboard (EPA): DTXSID1048380
- ECHA InfoCard: 100.055.567

Chemical and physical data
- Formula: C_{22}H_{43}N_{5}O_{12}
- Molar mass: 569.609 g·mol^{−1}
- 3D model (JSmol): Interactive image
- SMILES: C[C@@]1(CO[C@@H]([C@@H]([C@H]1NC)O)O[C@H]2[C@@H](C[C@@H]([C@H]([C@@H]2O)O[C@@H]3[C@@H]([C@H]([C@@H]([C@H](O3)CN)O)O)O)N)NC(=O)[C@H](CN)O)O
- InChI: InChI=1S/C22H43N5O12/c1-22(35)6-36-20(15(33)18(22)26-2)39-17-8(27-19(34)9(28)4-23)3-7(25)16(14(17)32)38-21-13(31)12(30)11(29)10(5-24)37-21/h7-18,20-21,26,28-33,35H,3-6,23-25H2,1-2H3,(H,27,34)/t7-,8+,9-,10+,11+,12-,13+,14-,15+,16+,17-,18+,20+,21+,22-/m0/s1; Key:UDIIBEDMEYAVNG-ZKFPOVNWSA-N

Isepamicin (isepamycin) is an aminoglycoside antibiotic.

It was patented in 1973 and approved for medical use in 1988. It has been identified by the World Health Organization as a Critically Important Antimicrobial for human use.

== Synthesis ==
Isepamicin can be synthesized by derivatization of gentamicin B (1) with benzyl N-[(2S)-3-(2,5-dioxopyrrolidin-1-yl)-2-hydroxy-3-oxopropyl]carbamate (2), followed by deprotection.

Synthesis of isepamicin from gentamicin B
