= Cefetamet =

Chemical compound

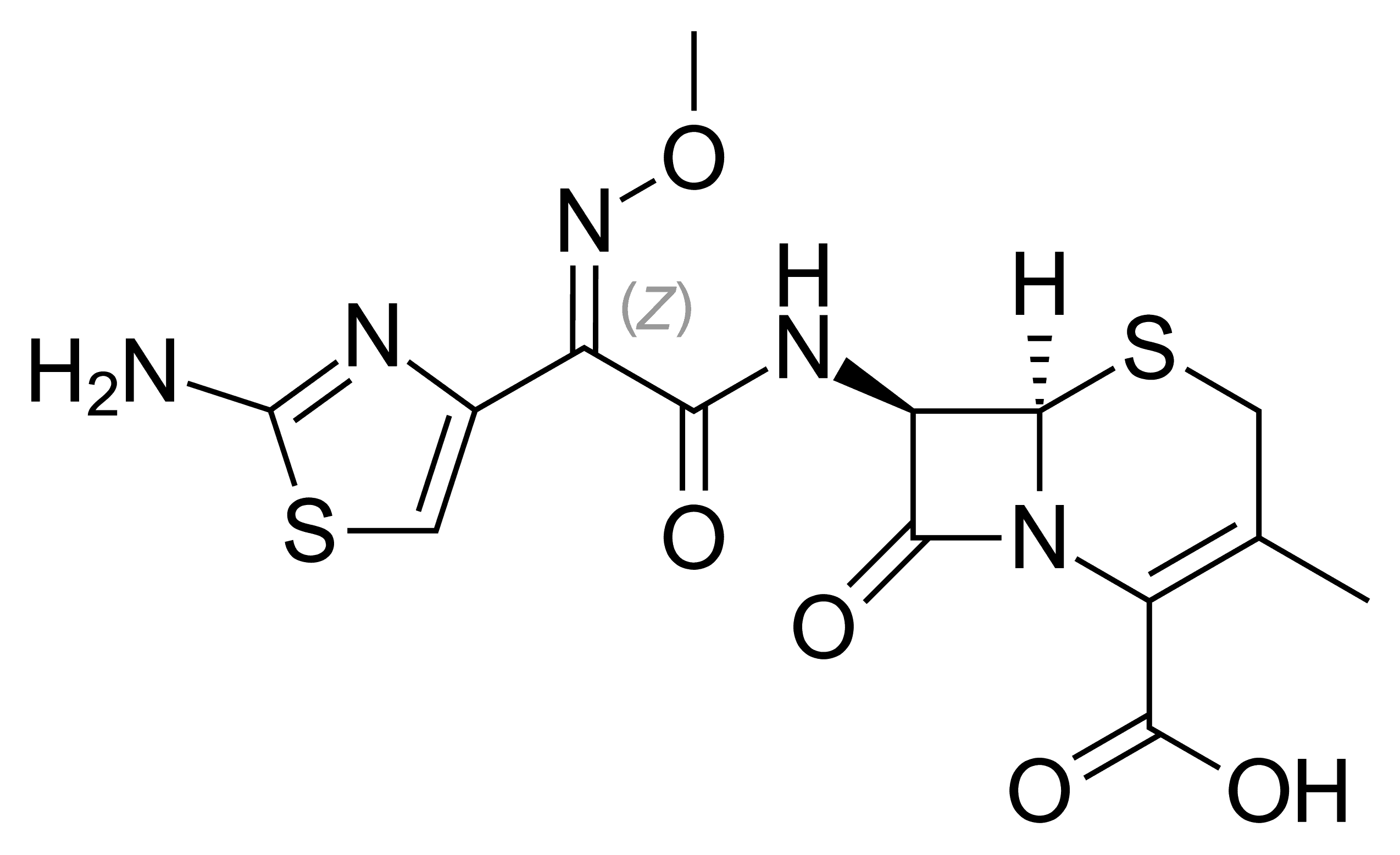

Clinical data
- ATC code: J01DD10 (WHO)

Identifiers
- IUPAC name: (6R,7R)-7-{[(2Z)-2-(2-amino-1,3-thiazol-4-yl)- 2-methoxyiminoacetyl]amino}-3-methyl-8-oxo- 5-thia-1-azabicyclo[4.2.0]oct-2-ene-2-carboxylic acid
- CAS Number: 65052-63-3
- PubChem CID: 5487888
- ChemSpider: 4589562
- UNII: 4R5TV783X3
- KEGG: D03424
- ChEMBL: (Nice) (Nice)2 ChEMBL55869 (Nice) (Nice)2
- CompTox Dashboard (EPA): DTXSID00867110
- ECHA InfoCard: 100.201.087

Chemical and physical data
- Formula: C_{14}H_{15}N_{5}O_{5}S_{2}
- Molar mass: 397.42 g·mol^{−1}
- 3D model (JSmol): Interactive image
- SMILES: O=C2N1/C(=C(\CS[C@@H]1[C@@H]2NC(=O)C(=N\OC)/c3nc(sc3)N)C)C(=O)O
- InChI: InChI=1S/C14H15N5O5S2/c1-5-3-25-12-8(11(21)19(12)9(5)13(22)23)17-10(20)7(18-24-2)6-4-26-14(15)16-6/h4,8,12H,3H2,1-2H3,(H2,15,16)(H,17,20)(H,22,23)/b18-7-/t8-,12-/m1/s1; Key:MQLRYUCJDNBWMV-GHXIOONMSA-N

Cefetamet is a cephalosporin antibiotic.
