= Garenoxacin =

Chemical compound

Clinical data
- Routes of administration: Oral
- ATC code: J01MA19 (WHO)

Identifiers
- IUPAC name: 1-Cyclopropyl-8-(difluoromethoxy)-7-[(1R)-1-methyl-2,3-dihydro-1H-isoindol-5-yl]-4-oxo-1,4-dihydroquinoline-3-carboxylic acid
- CAS Number: 194804-75-6
- PubChem CID: 124093
- ChemSpider: 110579
- UNII: V72H9867WB
- KEGG: D04031
- ChEBI: CHEBI:131716
- CompTox Dashboard (EPA): DTXSID30173135

Chemical and physical data
- Formula: C_{23}H_{20}F_{2}N_{2}O_{4}
- Molar mass: 426.420 g·mol^{−1}
- 3D model (JSmol): Interactive image
- SMILES: FC(F)Oc1c(ccc2c1N(/C=C(\C2=O)C(=O)O)C3CC3)c4ccc5c(c4)CN[C@@H]5C
- InChI: InChI=1S/C23H20F2N2O4/c1-11-15-5-2-12(8-13(15)9-26-11)16-6-7-17-19(21(16)31-23(24)25)27(14-3-4-14)10-18(20(17)28)22(29)30/h2,5-8,10-11,14,23,26H,3-4,9H2,1H3,(H,29,30)/t11-/m1/s1; Key:NJDRXTDGYFKORP-LLVKDONJSA-N

Garenoxacin (INN) is a quinolone antibiotic for the treatment of Gram-positive and Gram-negative bacterial infections.

Garenoxacin was discovered by Toyama Chemical Co., Ltd. of Tokyo, Japan, and is currently being marketed in Japan under the tradename Geninax. Schering-Plough holds worldwide rights for garenoxacin, except for Japan, South Korea, and China.

On February 13, 2006, Schering-Plough announced that the United States Food and Drug Administration had accepted the New Drug Application (NDA) for garenoxacin, and had been granted a 10-month review. As of 2015, however, it has not been approved in the US.

Schering-Plough later withdrew its application to the United States Food and Drug Administration, FDA, (August 20, 2006) for approval of the antibiotic Garenoxacin.

The European Medicines Agency (EMA) had also been formally notified by Schering-Plough Europe (July 25, 2007) of its decision to withdraw the application for a centralized marketing authorization for garenoxacin as well. Based on the CHMP review of the data regarding safety and efficacy (risk/benefit), the CHMP considered the application for garenoxacin to be unapprovable.
