= Sulfametomidine =

Chemical compound

Clinical data
- Routes of administration: Oral
- ATC code: J01ED03 (WHO)

Pharmacokinetic data
- Elimination half-life: 27 hours
- Excretion: Renal

Identifiers
- IUPAC name: 4-amino-N-(6-methoxy-2-methylpyrimidin-4-yl) benzenesulfonamide
- CAS Number: 3772-76-7
- PubChem CID: 19596
- ChemSpider: 18460
- UNII: 940ZL3AHKB
- ChEMBL: ChEMBL485940
- CompTox Dashboard (EPA): DTXSID0023616
- ECHA InfoCard: 100.021.109

Chemical and physical data
- Formula: C_{12}H_{14}N_{4}O_{3}S
- Molar mass: 294.33 g·mol^{−1}
- 3D model (JSmol): Interactive image
- SMILES: O=S(=O)(Nc1nc(nc(OC)c1)C)c2ccc(N)cc2
- InChI: InChI=1S/C12H14N4O3S/c1-8-14-11(7-12(15-8)19-2)16-20(17,18)10-5-3-9(13)4-6-10/h3-7H,13H2,1-2H3,(H,14,15,16); Key:QKLSCPPJEVXONT-UHFFFAOYSA-N

Sulfametomidine (or sulfamethomidine) is a sulfonamide antibacterial.
