= Tylvalosin =

Veterinary medication

Clinical data
- Trade names: Aivlosin
- AHFS/Drugs.com: Veterinary Use
- License data: US DailyMed: Tylvalosin
- Routes of administration: By mouth
- Drug class: Macrolide antibiotic
- ATCvet code: QJ01FA92 (WHO)

Legal status
- Legal status: US: ℞-only; EU: Rx-only

Identifiers
- CAS Number: 63409-12-1; as tartrate: 63428-13-7
- PubChem CID: 6441094
- DrugBank: DB11554; as tartrate: DBSALT001708
- ChemSpider: 4945313; as tartrate: 30790860
- UNII: 9T02S42WQO; as tartrate: AL5667FY0W
- KEGG: D10032; as tartrate: D10034
- ChEMBL: ChEMBL2103834
- CompTox Dashboard (EPA): DTXSID901016510
- ECHA InfoCard: 100.058.284

Chemical and physical data
- Formula: C_{53}H_{87}NO_{19}
- Molar mass: 1042.267 g·mol^{−1}
- 3D model (JSmol): Interactive image; as tartrate: Interactive image
- SMILES: CC[C@H]1OC(=O)C[C@@H](OC(C)=O)[C@H](C)[C@@H](O[C@@H]2O[C@H](C)[C@@H](O[C@H]3C[C@@](C)(O)[C@@H](OC(=O)CC(C)C)[C@H](C)O3)[C@@H]([C@H]2O)N(C)C)[C@@H](CC=O)C[C@@H](C)C(=O)\C=C\C(\C)=C\[C@@H]1CO[C@@H]1O[C@H](C)[C@@H](O)[C@@H](OC)[C@H]1OC; as tartrate: O[C@H]([C@@H](O)C(O)=O)C(O)=O.CC[C@H]1OC(=O)C[C@@H](OC(C)=O)[C@H](C)[C@@H](O[C@@H]2O[C@H](C)[C@@H](O[C@H]3C[C@@](C)(O)[C@@H](OC(=O)CC(C)C)[C@H](C)O3)[C@@H]([C@H]2O)N(C)C)[C@@H](CC=O)C[C@@H](C)C(=O)\C=C\C(\C)=C\[C@@H]1CO[C@@H]1O[C@H](C)[C@@H](O)[C@@H](OC)[C@H]1OC
- InChI: InChI=1S/C53H87NO19/c1-16-38-36(26-65-52-49(64-15)48(63-14)44(60)31(7)67-52)22-28(4)17-18-37(57)29(5)23-35(19-20-55)46(30(6)39(69-34(10)56)24-41(59)70-38)73-51-45(61)43(54(12)13)47(32(8)68-51)72-42-25-53(11,62)50(33(9)66-42)71-40(58)21-27(2)3/h17-18,20,22,27,29-33,35-36,38-39,42-52,60-62H,16,19,21,23-26H2,1-15H3/b18-17+,28-22+/t29-,30+,31-,32-,33+,35+,36-,38-,39-,42+,43-,44-,45-,46-,47-,48-,49-,50+,51+,52-,53-/m1/s1; Key:KCJJINQANFZSAM-HZDSEHBESA-N; as tartrate: InChI=1S/C53H87NO19.C4H6O6/c1-16-38-36(26-65-52-49(64-15)48(63-14)44(60)31(7)67-52)22-28(4)17-18-37(57)29(5)23-35(19-20-55)46(30(6)39(69-34(10)56)24-41(59)70-38)73-51-45(61)43(54(12)13)47(32(8)68-51)72-42-25-53(11,62)50(33(9)66-42)71-40(58)21-27(2)3;5-1(3(7)8)2(6)4(9)10/h17-18,20,22,27,29-33,35-36,38-39,42-52,60-62H,16,19,21,23-26H2,1-15H3;1-2,5-6H,(H,7,8)(H,9,10)/b18-17+,28-22+;/t29-,30+,31-,32-,33+,35+,36-,38-,39-,42+,43-,44-,45-,46-,47-,48-,49-,50+,51+,52-,53-;1-,2-/m11/s1; Key:OLLSDNUHBJHKJS-XKORHJEPSA-N

Tylvalosin, sold under the brand name Aivlosin, is a macrolide antibiotic used for the treatment of bacterial infections with Mycoplasma hyopneumoniae in swine, that causes enzootic pneumonia. It is used as the tartrate salt.

== Mechanism of Action ==
Macrolides are generally considered to be bacteriostatic agents that exert their antibiotic effect by reversibly binding to the 23S rRNA of the 50S ribosomal subunit, thereby inhibiting bacterial protein synthesis.

== Medical uses ==
Tylvalosin is indicated for the control of porcine proliferative enteropathy associated with Lawsonia intracellularis infection in groups of swine intended for slaughter and female swine intended for breeding in buildings experiencing an outbreak of PPE. Not for use in male swine intended for breeding; and for the control of swine respiratory disease associated with Bordetella bronchiseptica, Glaesserella (Haemophilus) parasuis, Pasteurella multocida, Streptococcus suis, and Mycoplasma hyopneumoniae in groups of swine intended for slaughter and female swine intended for breeding in buildings experiencing an outbreak of swine respiratory disease. Not for use in male swine intended for breeding.
