= Clofoctol =

Chemical compound

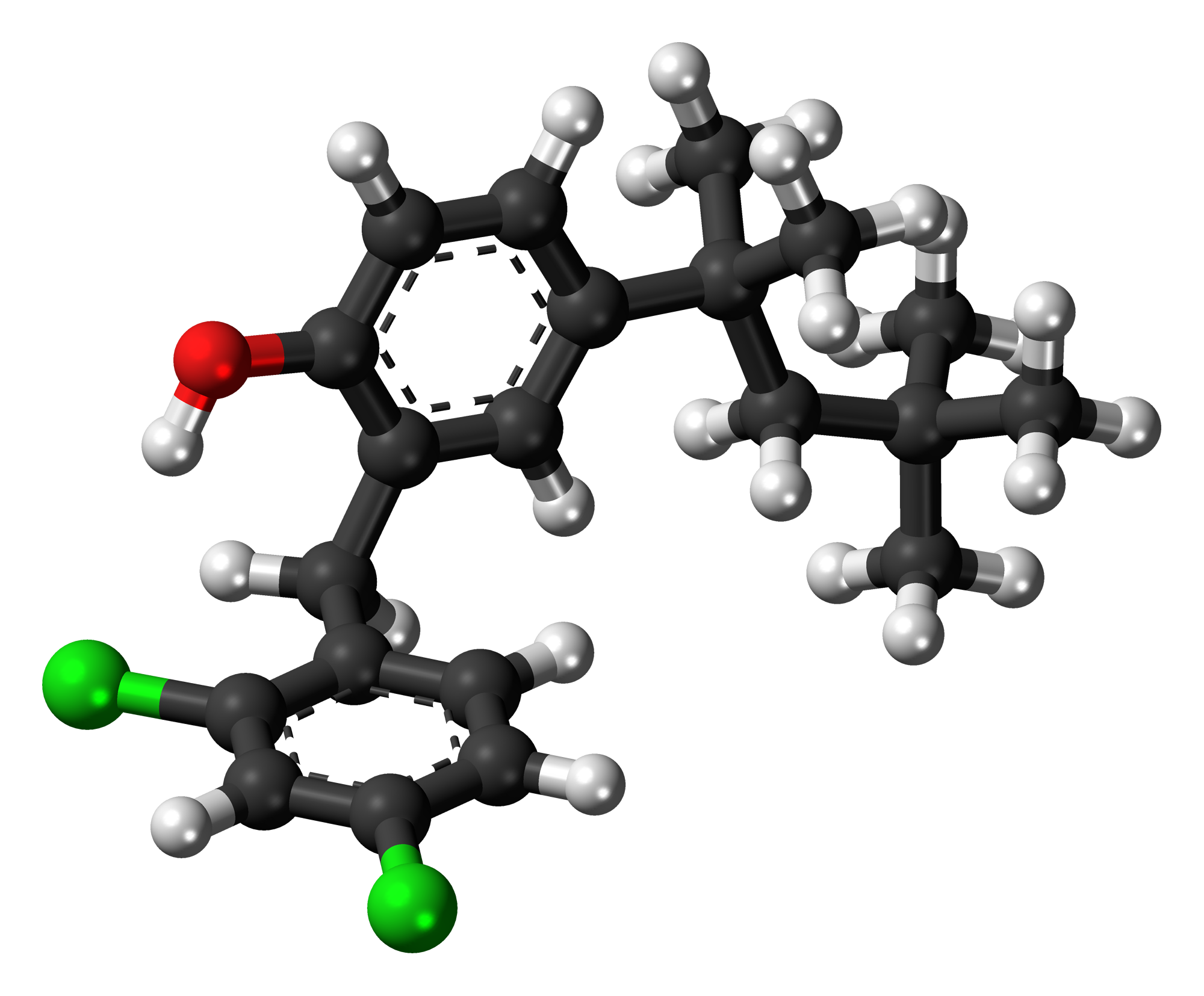

Clinical data
- AHFS/Drugs.com: International Drug Names
- Routes of administration: Rectal (suppository)
- ATC code: J01XX03 (WHO)

Pharmacokinetic data
- Bioavailability: 98%
- Metabolism: Hepatic glucuronidation
- Excretion: Biliary

Identifiers
- IUPAC name: 2-[(2,4-dichlorophenyl)methyl]- 4-(2,4,4-trimethylpentan-2-yl)phenol
- CAS Number: 37693-01-9
- PubChem CID: 2799
- DrugBank: DB13237
- ChemSpider: 2697
- UNII: 704083NI0R
- KEGG: D07244
- ChEMBL: ChEMBL1476605
- CompTox Dashboard (EPA): DTXSID5045889
- ECHA InfoCard: 100.048.739

Chemical and physical data
- Formula: C_{21}H_{26}Cl_{2}O
- Molar mass: 365.34 g·mol^{−1}
- 3D model (JSmol): Interactive image
- SMILES: Clc1cc(Cl)ccc1Cc2cc(ccc2O)C(C)(C)CC(C)(C)C
- InChI: InChI=1S/C21H26Cl2O/c1-20(2,3)13-21(4,5)16-7-9-19(24)15(11-16)10-14-6-8-17(22)12-18(14)23/h6-9,11-12,24H,10,13H2,1-5H3; Key:HQVZOORKDNCGCK-UHFFFAOYSA-N

Clofoctol is a bacteriostatic antibiotic. It is used in the treatment of respiratory tract and ear, nose and throat infections caused by Gram-positive bacteria. It has been marketed in France till 2005 under the trade name Octofene and in Italy as Gramplus.

It is only functional against Gram-positive bacteria.

It penetrates into human lung tissue.

A French company, Apteeus had been developing clofoctol as a potential therapy against SARS-CoV-2 in 2020-2021, but eventually the repurposing of the drug was abandoned, due to a lack of volunteers. A mouse study showed repurposed drug clofoctol blocks SARS-CoV-2 replication.
