= Kitasamycin =

Chemical compound

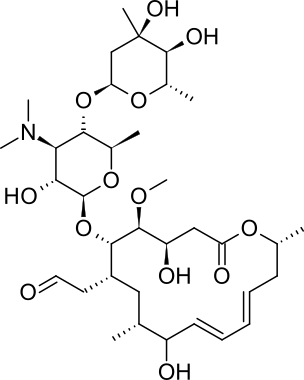

Clinical data
- Other names: Turimycin
- AHFS/Drugs.com: International Drug Names
- ATCvet code: QJ01FA93 (WHO)

Identifiers
- IUPAC name: [(4R,5S,6S,7R,9R,10R,11E,13E,16R)-6-{[(2S,3R,4R,5S,6R)-5-{[(2S,4R,5S,6S)-4,5-Dihydroxy-4,6-dimethyltetrahydro-2H-pyran-2-yl]oxy}-4-(dimethylamino)-3-hydroxy-6-methyltetrahydro-2H-pyran-2-yl]oxy}-4,10-dihydroxy-5-methoxy-9,16-dimethyl-2-oxooxacyclohexadeca-11,13-dien-7-yl]acetaldehyde (non-preferred name)
- CAS Number: 22875-15-6
- PubChem CID: 5282189
- ChemSpider: 4445382
- UNII: VW9SY2S5WL
- ChEMBL: ChEMBL1909061

Chemical and physical data
- Formula: C_{35}H_{59}NO_{13}
- Molar mass: 701.851 g·mol^{−1}
- 3D model (JSmol): Interactive image
- SMILES: C[C@@H]1C/C=C/C=C/[C@@H]([C@@H](C[C@@H]([C@@H]([C@H]([C@@H](CC(=O)O1)O)OC)O[C@H]2[C@@H]([C@H]([C@@H]([C@H](O2)C)O[C@H]3C[C@@]([C@H]([C@@H](O3)C)O)(C)O)N(C)C)O)CC=O)C)O
- InChI: InChI=1S/C35H59NO13/c1-19-16-23(14-15-37)31(32(44-8)25(39)17-26(40)45-20(2)12-10-9-11-13-24(19)38)49-34-29(41)28(36(6)7)30(21(3)47-34)48-27-18-35(5,43)33(42)22(4)46-27/h9-11,13,15,19-25,27-34,38-39,41-43H,12,14,16-18H2,1-8H3/b10-9+,13-11+/t19-,20-,21-,22+,23+,24+,25-,27+,28-,29-,30-,31+,32+,33+,34+,35-/m1/s1; Key:XYJOGTQLTFNMQG-KJHBSLKPSA-N

Kitasamycin (INN) is a macrolide antibiotic. It is produced by Streptomyces kitasatoensis. The drug has antimicrobial activity against a wide spectrum of pathogens. There are several generic names of this drug such as:

- Kitasamycin (OS: BAN, JAN, USAN)
- Kitasamycine (OS: DCF)
- C 637 (IS)
- Katasamycin (IS)
- Leucomycin (IS)
- Kitasamycin (PH: JP XV)
- Kitasamycin Acetate (OS: JAN)
- Leucomycin Acetate (IS)
- Kitasamycin Acetate (PH: JP XV)
- Kitasamycin Tartrate (OS: JAN)
- Leucomycin Tartrate (IS)
- Kitasamycin Tartrate (PH: JP XV)
