= Epicillin =

Chemical compound

Clinical data
- ATC code: J01CA07 (WHO)

Identifiers
- IUPAC name: (2S,5R,6R)-6-[[(2R)-2-Amino-2-(1-cyclohexa-1,4-dienyl)acetyl]amino]-3,3-dimethyl-7-oxo-4-thia-1-azabicyclo[3.2.0]heptane-2-carboxylic acid
- CAS Number: 26774-90-3
- PubChem CID: 71392
- ChemSpider: 64486
- UNII: 3LU1L73C8Y
- CompTox Dashboard (EPA): DTXSID60181288
- ECHA InfoCard: 100.043.623

Chemical and physical data
- Formula: C_{16}H_{21}N_{3}O_{4}S
- Molar mass: 351.42 g·mol^{−1}
- 3D model (JSmol): Interactive image
- SMILES: O=C(O)[C@@H]2N3C(=O)[C@@H](NC(=O)[C@@H](C/1=C/C\C=C/C\1)N)[C@H]3SC2(C)C
- InChI: InChI=1S/C16H21N3O4S/c1-16(2)11(15(22)23)19-13(21)10(14(19)24-16)18-12(20)9(17)8-6-4-3-5-7-8/h3-4,7,9-11,14H,5-6,17H2,1-2H3,(H,18,20)(H,22,23)/t9-,10-,11+,14-/m1/s1; Key:RPBAFSBGYDKNRG-NJBDSQKTSA-N

Epicillin (INN) is a penicillin antibiotic. It is not approved by the FDA for use in the United States.

It is an aminopenicillin.
