= Metampicillin =

Chemical compound

Clinical data
- ATC code: J01CA14 (WHO)

Identifiers
- IUPAC name: 3,3-Dimethyl-6-[[2-(methylideneamino)-2-phenylacetyl]amino]-7-oxo-4-thia-1-azabicyclo[3.2.0]heptane-2-carboxylic acid
- CAS Number: 6489-97-0
- PubChem CID: 6713928
- ChemSpider: 5145919
- UNII: G0H6U7VSTK
- ChEMBL: ChEMBL1908324
- CompTox Dashboard (EPA): DTXSID5048479
- ECHA InfoCard: 100.026.696

Chemical and physical data
- Formula: C_{17}H_{19}N_{3}O_{4}S
- Molar mass: 361.42 g·mol^{−1}
- 3D model (JSmol): Interactive image
- SMILES: CC1([C@@H](N2[C@H](S1)[C@@H](C2=O)NC(=O)[C@@H](c3ccccc3)N=C)C(=O)O)C
- InChI: InChI=1S/C17H19N3O4S/c1-17(2)12(16(23)24)20-14(22)11(15(20)25-17)19-13(21)10(18-3)9-7-5-4-6-8-9/h4-8,10-12,15H,3H2,1-2H3,(H,19,21)(H,23,24)/t10-,11-,12+,15-/m1/s1; Key:FZECHKJQHUVANE-MCYUEQNJSA-N

Metampicillin (INN) is a penicillin antibiotic. It is prepared by the reaction of ampicillin with formaldehyde, and is hydrolysed in aqueous solution with the formation of ampicillin. Hydrolysis is rapid under acid conditions, e.g., in the stomach, less rapid in neutral media, and incomplete in solutions such as human serum.
