= Cefminox =

Chemical compound

Clinical data
- AHFS/Drugs.com: International Drug Names
- Routes of administration: IM, IV
- ATC code: J01DC12 (WHO)

Legal status
- Legal status: In general: ℞ (Prescription only)

Identifiers
- IUPAC name: (6R,7S)-7-(((((2S)-2-amino-2-carboxyethyl)thio)acetyl)amino)-7-methoxy-3-(((1-methyl-1H-tetrazol-5-yl)thio)methyl)-8-oxo-5-thia-1-azabicyclo(4.2.0)oct-2-ene-2-carboxylic acid
- CAS Number: 84305-41-9
- PubChem CID: 71141
- ChemSpider: 64286
- UNII: PW08Y13465
- KEGG: D07642
- ChEBI: CHEBI:135817
- ChEMBL: ChEMBL1276342
- CompTox Dashboard (EPA): DTXSID301016174

Chemical and physical data
- Formula: C_{16}H_{21}N_{7}O_{7}S_{3}
- Molar mass: 519.57 g·mol^{−1}
- 3D model (JSmol): Interactive image
- SMILES: O=C2N1/C(=C(\CS[C@@H]1[C@]2(OC)NC(=O)CSC[C@H](C(=O)O)N)CSc3nnnn3C)C(=O)O
- InChI: InChI=1S/C16H21N7O7S3/c1-22-15(19-20-21-22)33-4-7-3-32-14-16(30-2,13(29)23(14)10(7)12(27)28)18-9(24)6-31-5-8(17)11(25)26/h8,14H,3-6,17H2,1-2H3,(H,18,24)(H,25,26)(H,27,28)/t8-,14-,16+/m1/s1; Key:JSDXOWVAHXDYCU-VXSYNFHWSA-N

Cefminox (INN) is a second-generation cephalosporin antibiotic.

== Spectrum ==
Cefminox is a broad-spectrum, bactericidal cephalosporin antibiotic. It is especially effective against Gram-negative and anaerobic bacteria. The following represents MIC data for a few medically significant microorganisms.

- Clostridioides difficile: 2 - 4 μg/ml
- Escherichia coli: 0.125 - 16 μg/ml
- Pseudomonas aeruginosa: 256 μg/ml
