= Carindacillin =

Chemical compound

Clinical data
- AHFS/Drugs.com: International Drug Names
- Routes of administration: Oral
- ATC code: J01CA05 (WHO)

Legal status
- Legal status: In general: ℞ (Prescription only)

Identifiers
- IUPAC name: (2S,5R,6R)-6-([3-(2,3-dihydro-1H-inden-5-yloxy)-3-oxo-2-phenylpropanoyl]amino)-3,3-dimethyl-7-oxo-4-thia-1-azabicyclo[3.2.0]heptane-2-carboxylic acid
- CAS Number: 35531-88-5; salt: 26605-69-6
- PubChem CID: 93184
- ChemSpider: 391995
- UNII: 5V278481KE; salt: 4OUL81K2RT
- ChEMBL: ChEMBL1200991
- CompTox Dashboard (EPA): DTXSID6048705

Chemical and physical data
- Formula: C_{26}H_{26}N_{2}O_{6}S
- Molar mass: 494.56 g·mol^{−1}
- 3D model (JSmol): Interactive image
- SMILES: [Na+].O=C([O-])[C@@H]4N5C(=O)[C@@H](NC(=O)C(c1ccccc1)C(=O)Oc2cc3c(cc2)CCC3)[C@H]5SC4(C)C

Carindacillin (INN), also known as carbenicillin indanyl (USAN), is a penicillin antibiotic. It is a prodrug of carbenicillin.

It is administered orally, as the sodium salt. It was formerly marketed in the United States by Pfizer under the brand name Geocillin. Pfizer withdrew Carindacillin from the U.S. market sometime after 2008.

== Pharmacokinetics ==
Shortly after absorption via the small intestine, carindacillin is hydrolyzed into carbenicillin. Carbenicillin acts by interfering with final cell wall synthesis in susceptible bacteria, including Pseudomonas aeruginosa, Escherichia coli, and some Proteus. The most common adverse effects include nausea, bad taste, diarrhea, vomiting, flatulence, and glossitis. Carindacillin was approved for use in adults in the treatment of prostatitis and urinary tract infections. Dosing was between 2000 and 4000 mg daily, divided into equally spaced doses.
