= Azidocillin =

Chemical compound

Clinical data
- Routes of administration: Oral, IV, IM
- ATC code: J01CE04 (WHO)

Pharmacokinetic data
- Bioavailability: 57–64%
- Elimination half-life: 0.6-1.1 hrs
- Excretion: 37–50% active substance in urine

Identifiers
- IUPAC name: 6-[(2-azido-2-phenylacetyl)amino]-3,3-dimethyl-7-oxo-4-thia-1-azabicyclo[3.2.0]heptane-2-carboxylic acid
- CAS Number: 17243-38-8
- PubChem CID: 71886
- DrugBank: DB08795
- ChemSpider: 16735689
- UNII: R8XDP7L3SL
- KEGG: D07235
- ChEBI: CHEBI:51758
- ChEMBL: ChEMBL2105907
- CompTox Dashboard (EPA): DTXSID20938154
- ECHA InfoCard: 100.037.510

Chemical and physical data
- Formula: C_{16}H_{17}N_{5}O_{4}S
- Molar mass: 375.40 g·mol^{−1}
- 3D model (JSmol): Interactive image
- SMILES: O=C(O)[C@@H]2N3C(=O)[C@@H](NC(=O)[C@H](\N=[N+]=[N-])c1ccccc1)[C@H]3SC2(C)C
- InChI: InChI=1S/C16H17N5O4S/c1-16(2)11(15(24)25)21-13(23)10(14(21)26-16)18-12(22)9(19-20-17)8-6-4-3-5-7-8/h3-7,9-11,14H,1-2H3,(H,18,22)(H,24,25)/t9-,10-,11+,14-/m1/s1; Key:ODFHGIPNGIAMDK-NJBDSQKTSA-N

Azidocillin is a type of penicillin.
