= Ceforanide =

Chemical compound

Clinical data
- AHFS/Drugs.com: International Drug Names
- Routes of administration: Intramuscular
- ATC code: J01DC11 (WHO)

Pharmacokinetic data
- Protein binding: 80.6%
- Metabolism: Nil
- Elimination half-life: 2.6 to 2.98 hours
- Excretion: Renal

Identifiers
- IUPAC name: (6R,7R)-7-{[2-[2-(aminomethyl)phenyl]acetyl]amino}-3- {[1-(carboxymethyl)tetrazol-5-yl]sulfanylmethyl}-8-oxo- 5-thia-1-azabicyclo[4.2.0]oct-2-ene-2-carboxylic acid
- CAS Number: 60925-61-3
- PubChem CID: 43507
- DrugBank: DB00923
- ChemSpider: 39656
- UNII: 8M1YF8951V
- KEGG: D00259
- ChEBI: CHEBI:3495
- ChEMBL: ChEMBL1201046
- NIAID ChemDB: 007642
- CompTox Dashboard (EPA): DTXSID1022760

Chemical and physical data
- Formula: C_{20}H_{21}N_{7}O_{6}S_{2}
- Molar mass: 519.55 g·mol^{−1}
- 3D model (JSmol): Interactive image
- SMILES: O=C2N1/C(=C(\CS[C@@H]1[C@@H]2NC(=O)Cc3ccccc3CN)CSc4nnnn4CC(=O)O)C(=O)O
- InChI: InChI=1S/C20H21N7O6S2/c21-6-11-4-2-1-3-10(11)5-13(28)22-15-17(31)27-16(19(32)33)12(8-34-18(15)27)9-35-20-23-24-25-26(20)7-14(29)30/h1-4,15,18H,5-9,21H2,(H,22,28)(H,29,30)(H,32,33)/t15-,18-/m1/s1; Key:SLAYUXIURFNXPG-CRAIPNDOSA-N

Ceforanide is a second-generation cephalosporin antibiotic.

== See also ==
- Cefotiam
