= Cefbuperazone =

Chemical compound

Clinical data
- Trade names: Tomiporan, Keiperazon
- AHFS/Drugs.com: International Drug Names
- Routes of administration: IM, IV
- ATC code: J01DC13 (WHO)

Legal status
- Legal status: In general: ℞ (Prescription only)

Identifiers
- IUPAC name: (6R,7S)-7-([(2R,3S)-2-[(4-Ethyl-2,3-dioxopiperazine-1-carbonyl)amino]-3-hydroxybutanoyl]amino)-7-methoxy-3-[(1-methyltetrazol-5-yl)sulfanylmethyl]-8-oxo-5-thia-1-azabicyclo[4.2.0]oct-2-ene-2-carboxylic acid
- CAS Number: 76610-84-9
- PubChem CID: 127527
- ChemSpider: 113142
- UNII: T0785J3X40
- KEGG: D03423
- ChEMBL: ChEMBL1908372
- CompTox Dashboard (EPA): DTXSID701024595

Chemical and physical data
- Formula: C_{22}H_{29}N_{9}O_{9}S_{2}
- Molar mass: 627.65 g·mol^{−1}
- 3D model (JSmol): Interactive image
- SMILES: CCN1CCN(C(=O)C1=O)C(=O)N[C@H]([C@H](C)O)C(=O)N[C@]2([C@@H]3N(C2=O)C(=C(CS3)CSC4=NN=NN4C)C(=O)O)OC
- InChI: InChI=1S/C22H29N9O9S2/c1-5-29-6-7-30(16(35)15(29)34)20(39)23-12(10(2)32)14(33)24-22(40-4)18(38)31-13(17(36)37)11(8-41-19(22)31)9-42-21-25-26-27-28(21)3/h10,12,19,32H,5-9H2,1-4H3,(H,23,39)(H,24,33)(H,36,37)/t10-,12+,19+,22-/m0/s1; Key:SMSRCGPDNDCXFR-CYWZMYCQSA-N

Cefbuperazone (INN) is a second-generation cephalosporin antibiotic. It was marketed in Japan as Tomiporan by Toyama Chemical and as Keiperazon by Kaken Pharmaceuticals. In clinical research, cefbuperazone was more effective against B. fragiis and less effective against a variety of anaerobic cocci than other, related cephalosporins, with overall antimicrobial activity being comparable to moxalactam.
