= Streptoduocin =

Combination drug

Combination of
- Streptomycin: Aminoglycoside antibiotic
- Dihydrostreptomycin: Aminoglycoside antibiotic

Clinical data
- ATC code: J01GA02 (WHO)

Identifiers
- CAS Number: 8017-59-2
- PubChem CID: 202223
- ChemSpider: 175124
- ChEMBL: ChEMBL3833407

Chemical and physical data
- 3D model (JSmol): Interactive image
- SMILES: C[C@H]1[C@@]([C@H]([C@@H](O1)O[C@@H]2[C@H]([C@@H]([C@H]([C@@H]([C@H]2O)O)N=C(N)N)O)N=C(N)N)O[C@H]3[C@H]([C@@H]([C@H]([C@@H](O3)CO)O)O)NC)(CO)O.C[C@H]1[C@@]([C@H]([C@@H](O1)O[C@@H]2[C@H]([C@@H]([C@H]([C@@H]([C@H]2O)O)N=C(N)N)O)N=C(N)N)O[C@H]3[C@H]([C@@H]([C@H]([C@@H](O3)CO)O)O)NC)(C=O)O

Streptoduocin is an aminoglycoside antibiotic.

It is a mixture of streptomycin and dihydrostreptomycin.
