= Clometocillin =

Chemical compound

Clinical data
- AHFS/Drugs.com: International Drug Names
- ATC code: J01CE07 (WHO)

Identifiers
- IUPAC name: (2S,5R,6R)-6-([2-(3,4-dichlorophenyl)-2-methoxyacetyl]amino)-3,3-dimethyl-7-oxo-4-thia-1-azabicyclo[3.2.0]heptane-2-carboxylic acid
- CAS Number: 1926-49-4
- PubChem CID: 71807
- ChemSpider: 64831
- UNII: YI8LL014GF
- KEGG: D07236
- ChEBI: CHEBI:131732
- ChEMBL: ChEMBL2106548
- CompTox Dashboard (EPA): DTXSID20172859
- ECHA InfoCard: 100.016.053

Chemical and physical data
- Formula: C_{17}H_{18}Cl_{2}N_{2}O_{5}S
- Molar mass: 433.30 g·mol^{−1}
- 3D model (JSmol): Interactive image
- SMILES: O=C(O)[C@@H]2N3C(=O)[C@@H](NC(=O)C(OC)c1ccc(Cl)c(Cl)c1)[C@H]3SC2(C)C

Clometocillin (or clometacillin) is a penicillin. It is marketed in Belgium as Rexipen.
