= Cefpiramide =

Chemical compound

Clinical data
- AHFS/Drugs.com: International Drug Names
- Routes of administration: Intravenous, intramuscular
- ATC code: J01DD11 (WHO)

Pharmacokinetic data
- Protein binding: 93% to 99.3%
- Elimination half-life: 4.44 hours
- Excretion: Renal and fecal

Identifiers
- IUPAC name: (6R)-7-{[(2R)-2-(4-hydroxyphenyl)-2-[(6-methyl- 4-oxo-1H-pyridine-3-carbonyl)amino]acetyl]amino}- 3-[(1-methyltetrazol-5-yl)sulfanylmethyl]-8-oxo- 5-thia-1-azabicyclo[4.2.0]oct-2-ene-2-carboxylic acid
- CAS Number: 70797-11-4
- PubChem CID: 636405
- DrugBank: DB00430
- ChemSpider: 552192
- UNII: P936YA152N
- KEGG: D03428
- ChEBI: CHEBI:59213
- ChEMBL: ChEMBL1201204
- CompTox Dashboard (EPA): DTXSID6046630

Chemical and physical data
- Formula: C_{25}H_{24}N_{8}O_{7}S_{2}
- Molar mass: 612.64 g·mol^{−1}
- 3D model (JSmol): Interactive image
- Melting point: 213 to 215 °C (415 to 419 °F) (dec.)
- SMILES: O=C2N1/C(=C(\CS[C@@H]1[C@@H]2NC(=O)[C@@H](c3ccc(O)cc3)NC(=O)C\4=C\N\C(=C/C/4=O)C)CSc5nnnn5C)C(=O)O
- InChI: InChI=1S/C25H24N8O7S2/c1-11-7-16(35)15(8-26-11)20(36)27-17(12-3-5-14(34)6-4-12)21(37)28-18-22(38)33-19(24(39)40)13(9-41-23(18)33)10-42-25-29-30-31-32(25)2/h3-8,17-18,23,34H,9-10H2,1-2H3,(H,26,35)(H,27,36)(H,28,37)(H,39,40)/t17-,18-,23-/m1/s1; Key:PWAUCHMQEXVFJR-PMAPCBKXSA-N

Cefpiramide is a third-generation cephalosporin antibiotic.
