= Tildipirosin =

Medication

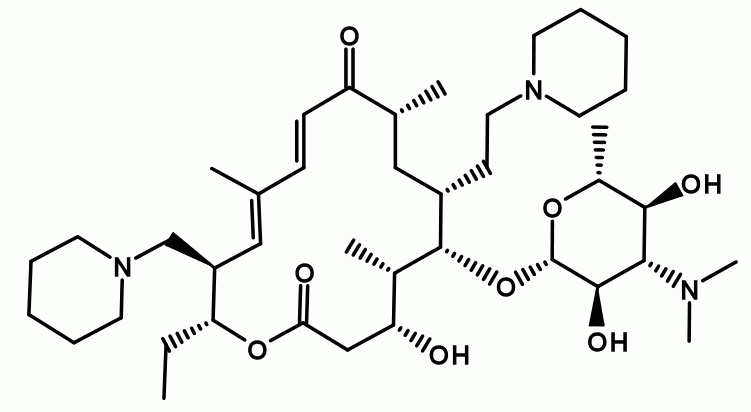

Clinical data
- Trade names: Zuprevo
- License data: US DailyMed: Tildipirosin
- Routes of administration: Intramuscular, subcutaneous
- ATCvet code: QJ01FA96 (WHO)

Legal status
- Legal status: CA: ℞-only; US: ℞-only; EU: Rx-only

Identifiers
- IUPAC name: (4R,5S,6S,7R,9R,11E,13E,15R,16R)-6-[(2R,3R,4S,5S,6R)-4-(Dimethylamino)-3,5-dihydroxy-6-methyloxan-2-yl]oxy-16-ethyl-4-hydroxy-5,9,13-trimethyl-7-(2-piperidin-1-ylethyl)-15-(piperidin-1-ylmethyl)-1-oxacyclohexadeca-11,13-diene-2,10-dione; (4R,5S,6S,7R,9R,11E,13E,15R,16R)-16-Ethyl-4-hydroxy-5,9,13-trimethyl-2,10-dioxo-7-[2-(1-piperidinyl)ethyl]-15-(1-piperidinylmethyl)oxacyclohexadeca-11,13-dien-6-yl 3,6-dideoxy-3-(dimethylamino)-β-D-glucopyranoside
- CAS Number: 328898-40-4
- PubChem CID: 24860548
- DrugBank: DB11470
- ChemSpider: 30790722
- UNII: S795AT66JB
- ChEMBL: ChEMBL3039509
- CompTox Dashboard (EPA): DTXSID70954546
- ECHA InfoCard: 100.168.011

Chemical and physical data
- Formula: C_{41}H_{71}N_{3}O_{8}
- Molar mass: 734.032 g·mol^{−1}
- 3D model (JSmol): Interactive image
- SMILES: CC[C@@H]1[C@H](/C=C(/C=C/C(=O)[C@@H](C[C@@H]([C@@H]([C@H]([C@@H](CC(=O)O1)O)C)O[C@H]2[C@@H]([C@H]([C@@H]([C@H](O2)C)O)N(C)C)O)CCN3CCCCC3)C)\C)CN4CCCCC4
- InChI: InChI=1S/C41H71N3O8/c1-8-35-32(26-44-20-13-10-14-21-44)23-27(2)15-16-33(45)28(3)24-31(17-22-43-18-11-9-12-19-43)40(29(4)34(46)25-36(47)51-35)52-41-39(49)37(42(6)7)38(48)30(5)50-41/h15-16,23,28-32,34-35,37-41,46,48-49H,8-14,17-22,24-26H2,1-7H3/b16-15+,27-23+/t28-,29+,30-,31+,32-,34-,35-,37+,38-,39-,40-,41+/m1/s1; Key:HNDXPZPJZGTJLJ-UEJFNEDBSA-N

Tildipirosin, sold under the brand name Zuprevo, is a macrolide antibiotic used in pigs and cattle.

== Medical uses ==
In the United States, tildipirosin is indicated for the treatment or control of bovine respiratory disease associated with Mannheimia haemolytica, Pasteurella multocida, and Histophilus somni in beef and non-lactating dairy cattle.

In the European Union, tildipirosin is indicated for the treatment and metaphylaxis of swine respiratory disease associated with Actinobacillus pleuropneumoniae, P. multocida, Bordetella bronchiseptica, and Glaesserella parasuis sensitive to tildipirosin; and for the treatment and prevention of bovine respiratory disease associated with M. haemolytica, P. multocida, and H. somni sensitive to tildipirosin.
