= Flurithromycin =

Chemical compound

Clinical data
- ATC code: J01FA14 (WHO)

Identifiers
- IUPAC name: (3R,4S,5S,6R,7R,9S,11R,12R,13S,14R)-6- [(2S,3R,4S,6R)-4-dimethylamino-3-hydroxy- 6-methyloxan-2-yl]oxy-14-ethyl-9-fluoro-7,12, 13-trihydroxy-4-[(2R,4R,5S,6S)-5-hydroxy- 4-methoxy-4,6-dimethyloxan-2-yl]oxy-3,5,7,9, 11,13-hexamethyl-1-oxacyclotetradecane-2,10-dione
- CAS Number: 82664-20-8
- PubChem CID: 71260
- ChemSpider: 64388
- UNII: 56C9DTE69V
- KEGG: D07242
- ChEBI: CHEBI:131719
- ChEMBL: ChEMBL2106403
- CompTox Dashboard (EPA): DTXSID40905085
- ECHA InfoCard: 100.126.548

Chemical and physical data
- Formula: C_{37}H_{66}FNO_{13}
- Molar mass: 751.927 g·mol^{−1}
- 3D model (JSmol): Interactive image
- SMILES: O=C3O[C@H](CC)[C@](O)(C)[C@H](O)[C@H](C(=O)[C@](F)(C)C[C@](O)(C)[C@H](O[C@@H]1O[C@H](C)C[C@H](N(C)C)[C@H]1O)[C@H]([C@H](O[C@@H]2O[C@H]([C@H](O)[C@](OC)(C2)C)C)[C@H]3C)C)C
- InChI: InChI=1S/C37H66FNO13/c1-14-24-37(10,46)29(42)21(5)28(41)34(7,38)17-35(8,45)31(52-33-26(40)23(39(11)12)15-18(2)48-33)19(3)27(20(4)32(44)50-24)51-25-16-36(9,47-13)30(43)22(6)49-25/h18-27,29-31,33,40,42-43,45-46H,14-17H2,1-13H3/t18-,19+,20-,21+,22+,23+,24-,25+,26-,27+,29-,30+,31-,33+,34+,35-,36-,37-/m1/s1; Key:XOEUHCONYHZURQ-HNUBZJOYSA-N

Flurithromycin is a second generation macrolide antibiotic. It is a fluorinated derivative of erythromycin A. It is a broad spectrum antibiotic with similar bactericidal action to erythromycin. Unlike erythromycin, flurithromycin is more tolerant of acidic environments, meaning more survives the digestion process, resulting in higher serum levels, and more efficacious elimination of susceptible bacteria, including staphylococcus aureus and streptococcus pyogenes.
