= Cefteram =

Chemical compound

Clinical data
- AHFS/Drugs.com: International Drug Names
- ATC code: J01DD18 (WHO)

Legal status
- Legal status: In general: ℞ (Prescription only)

Identifiers
- IUPAC name: (6R,7R)-7-([(2Z)-2-(2-amino-1,3-thiazol-4-yl)-2-methoxyiminoacetyl]amino)-3-[(5-methyltetrazol-2-yl)methyl]-8-oxo-5-thia-1-azabicyclo[4.2.0]oct-2-ene-2-carboxylic acid
- CAS Number: 82547-58-8
- PubChem CID: 6537431
- ChemSpider: 4576594
- UNII: 74CQ4Q3N63
- KEGG: D07655
- ChEMBL: ChEMBL2105953
- CompTox Dashboard (EPA): DTXSID7048821

Chemical and physical data
- Formula: C_{16}H_{17}N_{9}O_{5}S_{2}
- Molar mass: 479.49 g·mol^{−1}
- 3D model (JSmol): Interactive image
- SMILES: O=C2N1/C(=C(\CS[C@@H]1[C@@H]2NC(=O)C(=N\OC)\c3nc(sc3)N)Cn4nc(nn4)C)C(=O)O

Cefteram (INN) is a third-generation cephalosporin antibiotic.

== Synthesis ==

The reaction of 7-aminocephalosporanic acid (1) with the methyl-substituted tetrazole (2) gives the intermediate (3). Protection with diazodiphenylmethane (4) produces (5). Amide formation with the thiazole carboxylic acid (6) gives (7), which is deprotected with trifluoroacetic acid to yield cefteram.
