= Clomocycline =

Chemical compound

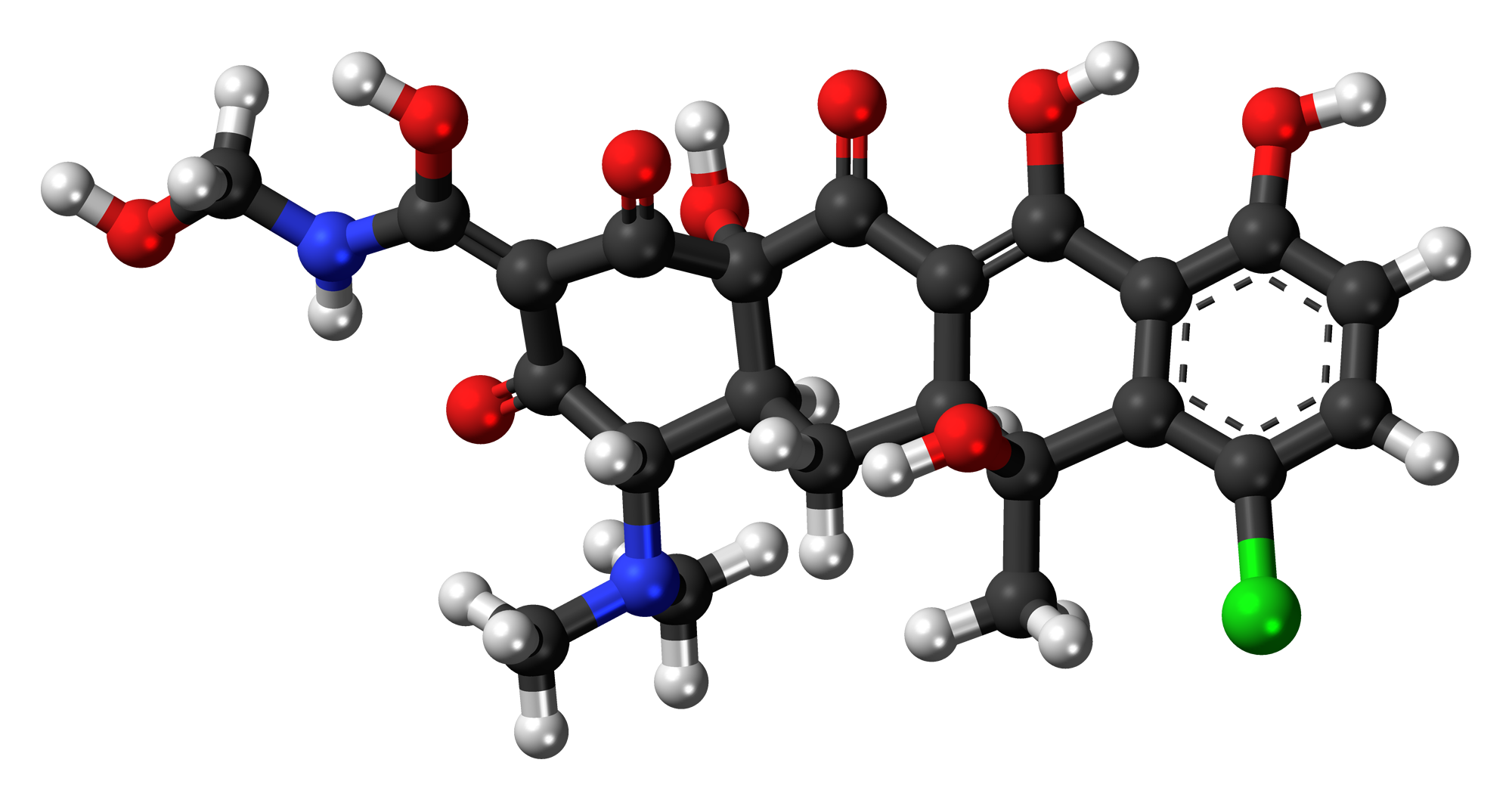

Clinical data
- Other names: (2Z,4S,4aS,5aS,6S,12aS)-7-chloro-4-dimethylamino-6,10,11,12a-tetrahydroxy-2-[hydroxy-(hydroxymethylamino)methylidene]-6-methyl-4,4a,5,5a-tetrahydrotetracene-1,3,12-trione
- ATC code: J01AA11 (WHO)

Identifiers
- IUPAC name: (4S,4aS,5aS,6S,12aR)-7-Chloro-4-(dimethylamino)-1,6,10,11,12a-pentahydroxy-N-(hydroxymethyl)-6-methyl-3,12-dioxo-4,4a,5,5a-tetrahydrotetracene-2-carboxamide
- CAS Number: 1181-54-0
- PubChem CID: 54680675
- DrugBank: DB00453
- ChemSpider: 16735748
- UNII: YP0241BU76
- KEGG: D06885
- ChEMBL: ChEMBL2106071
- CompTox Dashboard (EPA): DTXSID80905089

Chemical and physical data
- Formula: C_{23}H_{25}ClN_{2}O_{9}
- Molar mass: 508.91 g·mol^{−1}
- 3D model (JSmol): Interactive image
- SMILES: Clc1c4c(c(O)cc1)C(\O)=C3\C(=O)[C@]2(O)C(=O)/C(C(=O)[C@@H](N(C)C)[C@@H]2C[C@@H]3[C@@]4(O)C)=C(\O)NCO
- InChI: InChI=1S/C23H25ClN2O9/c1-22(34)8-6-9-16(26(2)3)18(30)14(21(33)25-7-27)20(32)23(9,35)19(31)12(8)17(29)13-11(28)5-4-10(24)15(13)22/h4-5,8-9,16,27-28,30-31,34-35H,6-7H2,1-3H3,(H,25,33)/t8?,9-,16-,22-,23-/m0/s1; Key:GJGDLRSSCNAKGL-BJNNJSPUSA-N

Clomocycline is a tetracycline antibiotic. It is used to treat Pustulosis palmaris et plantaris.
