= Sulfamazone =

Chemical compound

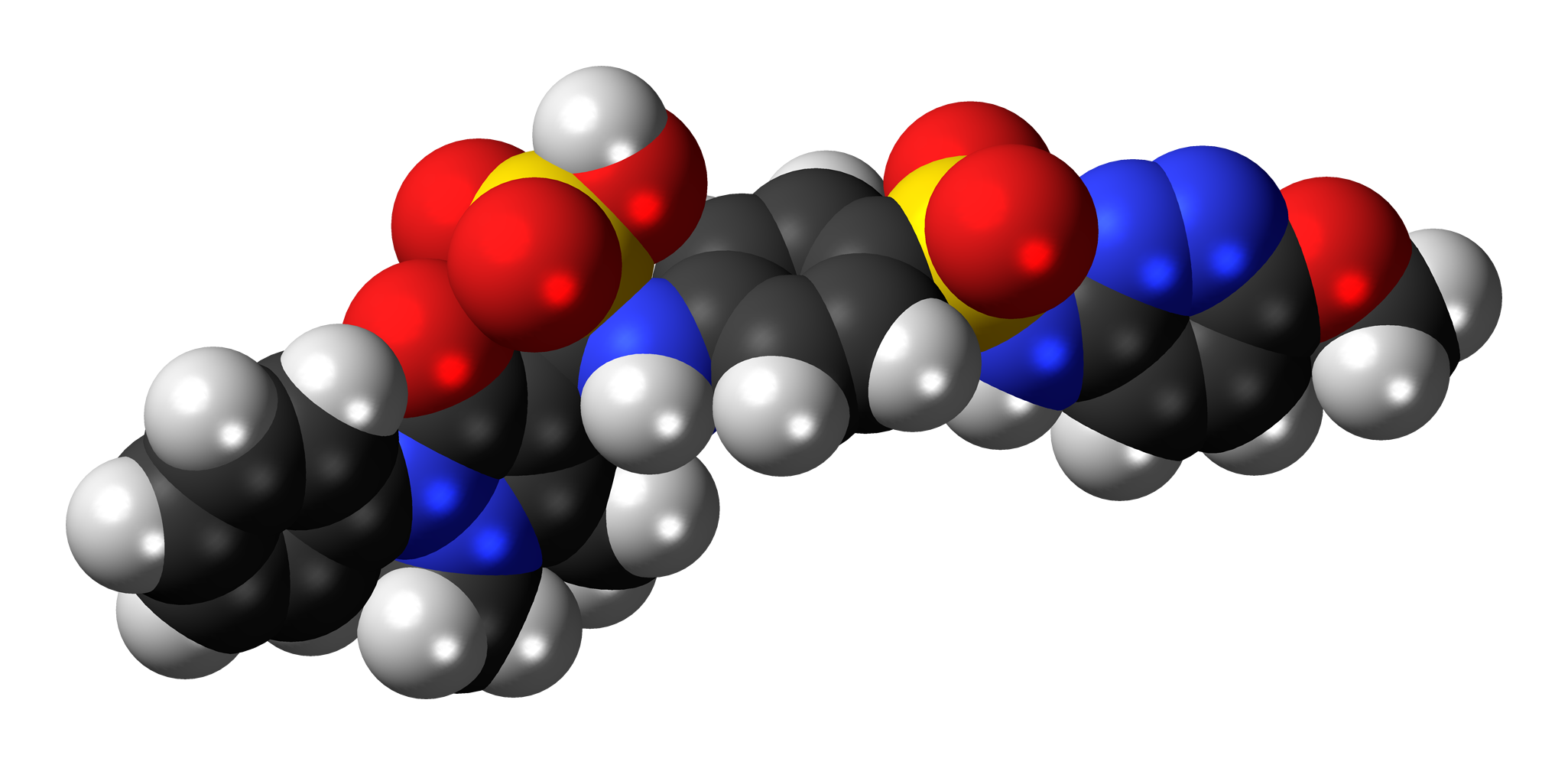

Clinical data
- ATC code: J01ED09 (WHO)

Identifiers
- IUPAC name: (1,5-dimethyl-3-oxo-2-phenylpyrazol-4-yl)-{[4-[(6- methoxypyridazin-3-l)sulfamoyl]phenyl]amino} methanesulfonic acid
- CAS Number: 65761-24-2
- PubChem CID: 187764
- ChemSpider: 163211
- UNII: D7B8U8VA9J
- KEGG: D07241
- ChEBI: CHEBI:131721
- ChEMBL: ChEMBL2104921
- CompTox Dashboard (EPA): DTXSID50867180

Chemical and physical data
- Formula: C_{23}H_{24}N_{6}O_{7}S_{2}
- Molar mass: 560.60 g·mol^{−1}
- 3D model (JSmol): Interactive image
- SMILES: CC1=C(C(=O)N(N1C)C2=CC=CC=C2)C(NC3=CC=C(C=C3)S(=O)(=O)NC4=NN=C(C=C4)OC)S(=O)(=O)O
- InChI: InChI=1S/C23H24N6O7S2/c1-15-21(23(30)29(28(15)2)17-7-5-4-6-8-17)22(38(33,34)35)24-16-9-11-18(12-10-16)37(31,32)27-19-13-14-20(36-3)26-25-19/h4-14,22,24H,1-3H3,(H,25,27)(H,33,34,35); Key:BGLHAKAJGYLSOX-UHFFFAOYSA-N

Sulfamazone (INN) is a sulfonamide antibiotic with antipyretic properties.
