= Aspoxicillin =

Chemical compound

Clinical data
- Trade names: Doyle
- Other names: TA-058

Identifiers
- IUPAC name: (2S,5R,6R)-6-[[(2R)-2-[[(2R)-2-Amino-4-(methylamino)-4-oxobutanoyl]amino]-2-(4-hydroxyphenyl)acetyl]amino]-3,3-dimethyl-7-oxo-4-thia-1-azabicyclo[3.2.0]heptane-2-carboxylic acid
- CAS Number: 63358-49-6
- PubChem CID: 71961
- DrugBank: DB13816
- ChemSpider: 64968
- UNII: 0745KNO26J
- KEGG: D07469
- ChEBI: CHEBI:31240
- ChEMBL: ChEMBL1318150
- CompTox Dashboard (EPA): DTXSID6046921
- ECHA InfoCard: 100.162.655

Chemical and physical data
- Formula: C_{21}H_{27}N_{5}O_{7}S
- Molar mass: 493.54 g·mol^{−1}
- 3D model (JSmol): Interactive image
- SMILES: CC1([C@@H](N2[C@H](S1)[C@@H](C2=O)NC(=O)[C@@H](C3=CC=C(C=C3)O)NC(=O)[C@@H](CC(=O)NC)N)C(=O)O)C
- InChI: InChI=1S/C21H27N5O7S/c1-21(2)15(20(32)33)26-18(31)14(19(26)34-21)25-17(30)13(9-4-6-10(27)7-5-9)24-16(29)11(22)8-12(28)23-3/h4-7,11,13-15,19,27H,8,22H2,1-3H3,(H,23,28)(H,24,29)(H,25,30)(H,32,33)/t11-,13-,14-,15+,19-/m1/s1; Key:BHELIUBJHYAEDK-OAIUPTLZSA-N

Aspoxicillin (trade name Doyle) is an antibiotic drug of the beta-lactam class. It is an injectable form of penicillin that is highly active against Gram-positive and Gram-negative bacteria, including Bacillus fragilis, which is resistant to other beta-lactam antibiotics. It is approved for use in Japan.
