= Lascufloxacin =

Chemical compound

Clinical data
- Trade names: Lasvic
- Other names: KRP-AM1977

Identifiers
- IUPAC name: 7-[(3S,4S)-3-[(Cyclopropylamino)methyl]-4-fluoropyrrolidin-1-yl]-6-fluoro-1-(2-fluoroethyl)-8-methoxy-4-oxoquinoline-3-carboxylic acid
- CAS Number: 848416-07-9
- PubChem CID: 71528768
- IUPHAR/BPS: 10823
- ChemSpider: 34985131
- UNII: 55MOB566V7
- KEGG: D10772
- CompTox Dashboard (EPA): DTXSID001336967

Chemical and physical data
- Formula: C_{21}H_{24}F_{3}N_{3}O_{4}
- Molar mass: 439.435 g·mol^{−1}
- 3D model (JSmol): Interactive image
- SMILES: COC1=C2C(=CC(=C1N3C[C@@H]([C@@H](C3)F)CNC4CC4)F)C(=O)C(=CN2CCF)C(=O)O

Lascufloxacin (trade name Lasvic) is an fluoroquinolone antibiotic drug for the treatment of bacterial infections. It has been approved since 2019 in Japan to treat community-acquired pneumonia, otorhinolaryngological infections, and respiratory tract infections.

It has activity against various Gram-positive bacteria including Streptococcus pneumoniae and Streptococcus anginosus.
