= Xibornol =

Chemical compound

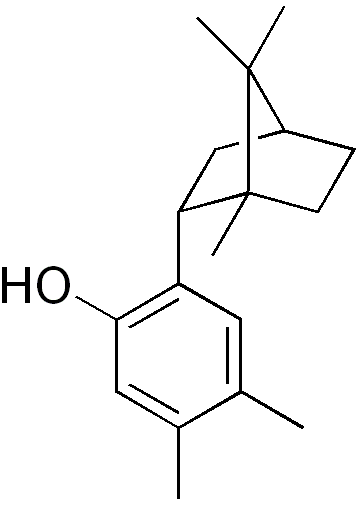

Clinical data
- AHFS/Drugs.com: International Drug Names
- ATC code: J01XX02 (WHO)

Identifiers
- IUPAC name: 4,5-dimethyl-2-[(1S,4R,6R)-1,7,7-trimethyl-6-bicyclo[2.2.1]heptanyl]phenol
- CAS Number: 13741-18-9
- PubChem CID: 11777299
- DrugBank: DB13714
- ChemSpider: 9951982
- UNII: RQ12GMY0FZ
- KEGG: D07433
- ChEBI: CHEBI:131713
- ChEMBL: ChEMBL2104519
- CompTox Dashboard (EPA): DTXSID60472406
- ECHA InfoCard: 100.033.906

Chemical and physical data
- Formula: C_{18}H_{26}O
- Molar mass: 258.405 g·mol^{−1}
- 3D model (JSmol): Interactive image
- SMILES: Oc1cc(c(cc1C2CC3CCC2(C)C3(C)C)C)C
- InChI: InChI=1S/C18H26O/c1-11-8-14(16(19)9-12(11)2)15-10-13-6-7-18(15,5)17(13,3)4/h8-9,13,15,19H,6-7,10H2,1-5H3; Key:RNRHMQWZFJXKLZ-UHFFFAOYSA-N

Xibornol is a lipophilic substance with antiseptic properties, mainly used in Italy and Spain. It is primarily administered to the throat as a spray mouthwash. As of 2007, all approved forms are water-based suspensions.

The drug was discovered in the 1970s.
