= Sulfaperin =

Chemical compound

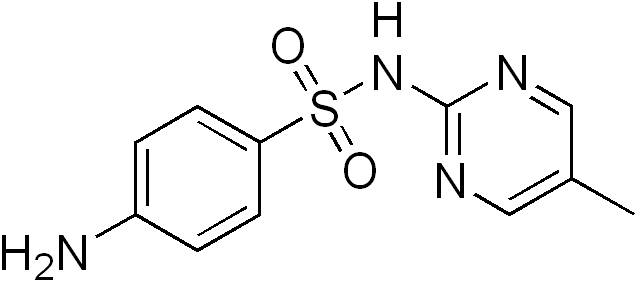

Clinical data
- ATC code: J01ED06 (WHO)

Identifiers
- IUPAC name: 4-amino-N-(5-methylpyrimidin-2-yl)benzenesulfonamide
- CAS Number: 599-88-2
- PubChem CID: 68933
- ChemSpider: 62158
- UNII: W5E840UV9P
- KEGG: D07240
- ChEBI: CHEBI:131722
- CompTox Dashboard (EPA): DTXSID2057782
- ECHA InfoCard: 100.009.071

Chemical and physical data
- Formula: C_{11}H_{12}N_{4}O_{2}S
- Molar mass: 264.30 g·mol^{−1}
- 3D model (JSmol): Interactive image
- SMILES: O=S(=O)(Nc1ncc(cn1)C)c2ccc(N)cc2
- InChI: InChI=1S/C11H12N4O2S/c1-8-6-13-11(14-7-8)15-18(16,17)10-4-2-9(12)3-5-10/h2-7H,12H2,1H3,(H,13,14,15); Key:DZQVFHSCSRACSX-UHFFFAOYSA-N

Sulfaperin (or sulfaperine) is a sulfonamide antibacterial.
