= Sulfamoxole =

Chemical compound

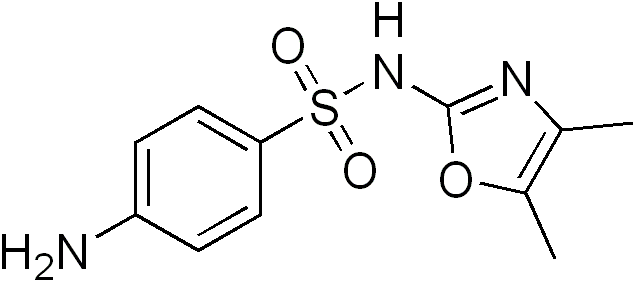

Clinical data
- ATC code: J01EC03 (WHO)

Identifiers
- IUPAC name: 4-amino-N-(4,5-dimethyl-1,3-oxazol-2-yl)benzenesulfonamide
- CAS Number: 729-99-7
- PubChem CID: 12894
- DrugBank: DB08798
- ChemSpider: 12361
- UNII: HGG82XE020
- KEGG: D02516
- ChEBI: CHEBI:55548
- CompTox Dashboard (EPA): DTXSID5023617
- ECHA InfoCard: 100.010.894

Chemical and physical data
- Formula: C_{11}H_{13}N_{3}O_{3}S
- Molar mass: 267.30 g·mol^{−1}
- 3D model (JSmol): Interactive image
- SMILES: O=S(=O)(Nc1nc(c(o1)C)C)c2ccc(N)cc2
- InChI: InChI=1S/C11H13N3O3S/c1-7-8(2)17-11(13-7)14-18(15,16)10-5-3-9(12)4-6-10/h3-6H,12H2,1-2H3,(H,13,14); Key:CYFLXLSBHQBMFT-UHFFFAOYSA-N

Sulfamoxole is a sulfonamide antibacterial.
