= Sulfachlorpyridazine =

Names
- Preferred IUPAC name 4-Amino-N-(6-chloropyridazin-3-yl)benzene-1-sulfonamide

Identifiers
CAS Number	80-32-0
3D model (JSmol)	Interactive image
Beilstein Reference	261558
ChEBI	CHEBI:59057
ChEMBL	ChEMBL1443577
ChemSpider	6382
ECHA InfoCard	100.001.155
EC Number	201-269-9
KEGG	D05948
PubChem CID	6634
UNII	P78D9P90C0
CompTox Dashboard (EPA)	DTXSID9045265
- InChI: InChI=1S/C10H9ClN4O2S/c11-9-5-6-10(14-13-9)15-18(16,17)8-3-1-7(12)2-4-8/h1-6H,12H2,(H,14,15) Key: XOXHILFPRYWFOD-UHFFFAOYSA-N
- SMILES: Nc1ccc(S(=O)(=O)Nc2ccc(Cl)nn2)cc1

Properties
Chemical formula	C_{10}H_{9}ClN_{4}O_{2}S
Molar mass	284.72 g·mol^{−1}

Hazards
- GHS labelling
Pictograms	(GHS07: Exclamation mark)
Signal word	Warning
Hazard statements	H317
Precautionary statements	P261, P272, P280, P302+P352, P321, P333+P313, P363, P501
- Except where otherwise noted, data are given for materials in their standard state (at 25 °C [77 °F], 100 kPa). Infobox references

Sulfachlorpyridazine (INN, USP) is a sulfonamide antibiotic drug used in poultry farming. It has been marketed as Vetisulid for use in cattle, swine and birds and as Cosumix Plus (combination with trimethoprim) for use with poultry.
