= Cefatrizine =

Chemical compound

Clinical data
- Trade names: Cefaperos, Zanitrin
- AHFS/Drugs.com: International Drug Names
- Routes of administration: Oral
- ATC code: J01DB07 (WHO)

Identifiers
- IUPAC name: (6R,7R)-7-{[(2R)-2-Amino-2-(4-hydroxyphenyl)acetyl]amino}-8-oxo-3-[(1H-1,2,3-triazol-4-ylsulfanyl)methyl]-5-thia-1-azabicyclo[4.2.0]oct-2-ene-2-carboxylic acid
- CAS Number: 51627-14-6
- PubChem CID: 6410758
- ChemSpider: 4918615
- UNII: 8P4W949T8K
- KEGG: D02711
- ChEBI: CHEBI:131730
- ChEMBL: ChEMBL1095284
- CompTox Dashboard (EPA): DTXSID7022752
- ECHA InfoCard: 100.052.096

Chemical and physical data
- Formula: C_{18}H_{18}N_{6}O_{5}S_{2}
- Molar mass: 462.50 g·mol^{−1}
- 3D model (JSmol): Interactive image
- SMILES: O=C2N1/C(=C(\CS[C@@H]1[C@@H]2NC(=O)[C@@H](c3ccc(O)cc3)N)CSc4nn[nH]c4)C(=O)O
- InChI: InChI=1S/C18H18N6O5S2/c19-12(8-1-3-10(25)4-2-8)15(26)21-13-16(27)24-14(18(28)29)9(7-31-17(13)24)6-30-11-5-20-23-22-11/h1-5,12-13,17,25H,6-7,19H2,(H,21,26)(H,28,29)(H,20,22,23)/t12-,13-,17-/m1/s1; Key:UOCJDOLVGGIYIQ-PBFPGSCMSA-N

Cefatrizine is a first-generation broad-spectrum cephalosporin antibiotic that was developed in the 1970s by GSK plc. It was sold commercially by Bristol Myers Squibb in France as Cefaperos and in Pakistan as Zanitrin. Though the subject of some clinical trials in the United States, it was never brought to market there.
