= Sulfisomidine =

Chemical compound

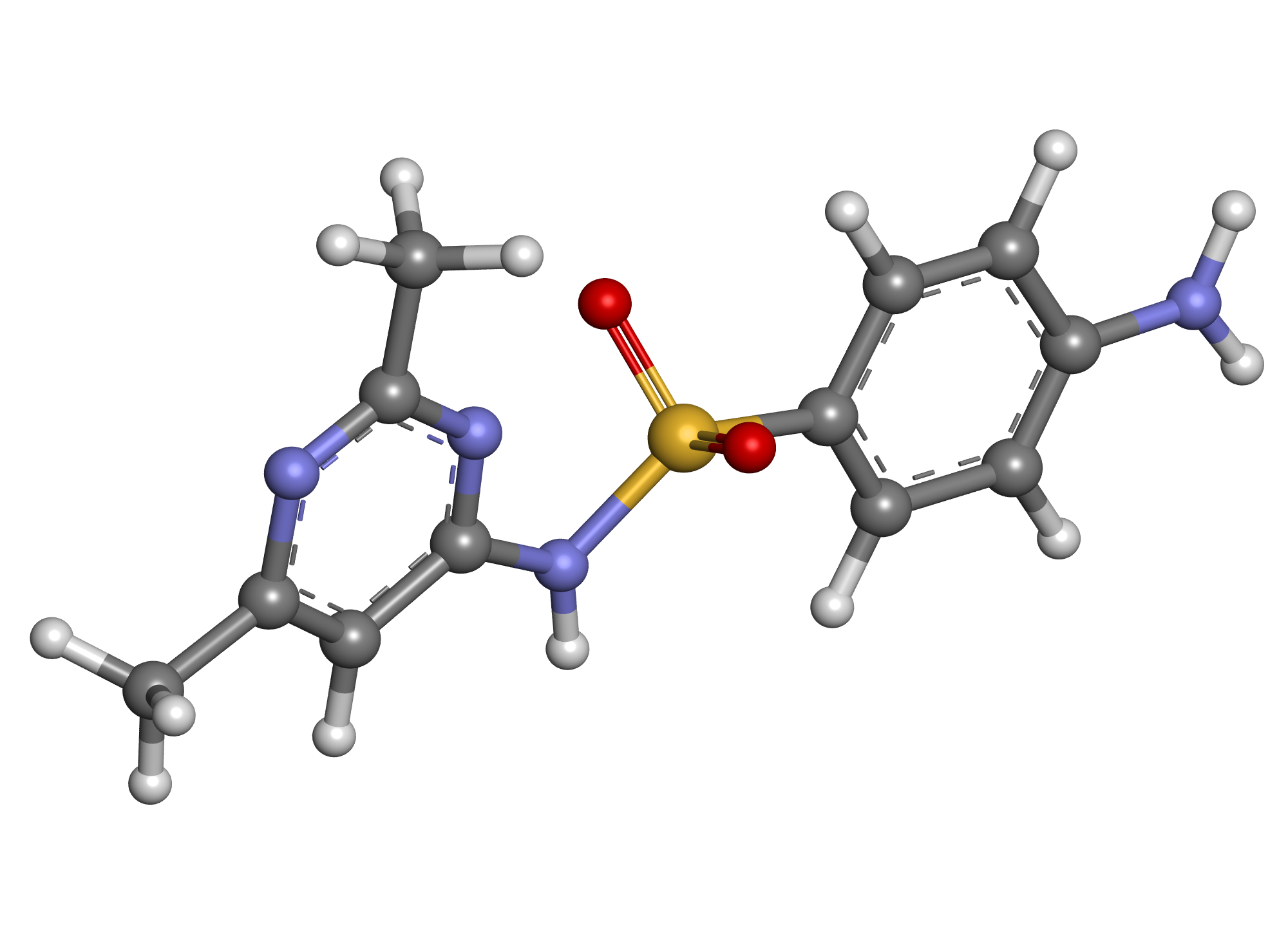

Clinical data
- Routes of administration: Oral
- ATC code: J01EB01 (WHO)

Pharmacokinetic data
- Metabolism: Minor acetylation
- Excretion: Renal, 85%

Identifiers
- IUPAC name: 4-amino-N-(2,6-dimethylpyrimidin-4-yl) benzenesulfonamide
- CAS Number: 515-64-0
- PubChem CID: 5343
- ChemSpider: 5150
- UNII: W03L3ODK6E
- KEGG: D01526
- ChEBI: CHEBI:32166
- ChEMBL: ChEMBL485696
- CompTox Dashboard (EPA): DTXSID1046390
- ECHA InfoCard: 100.007.460

Chemical and physical data
- Formula: C_{12}H_{14}N_{4}O_{2}S
- Molar mass: 278.33 g·mol^{−1}
- 3D model (JSmol): Interactive image
- SMILES: O=S(=O)(Nc1nc(nc(c1)C)C)c2ccc(N)cc2
- InChI: InChI=1S/C12H14N4O2S/c1-8-7-12(15-9(2)14-8)16-19(17,18)11-5-3-10(13)4-6-11/h3-7H,13H2,1-2H3,(H,14,15,16); Key:YZMCKZRAOLZXAZ-UHFFFAOYSA-N

Sulfisomidine (INN), also known as sulphasomidine (BAN until 2003), sulfamethin and sulfaisodimidine, is a sulfonamide antibacterial. It is closely related to sulfadimidine.
