= Midecamycin =

Chemical compound

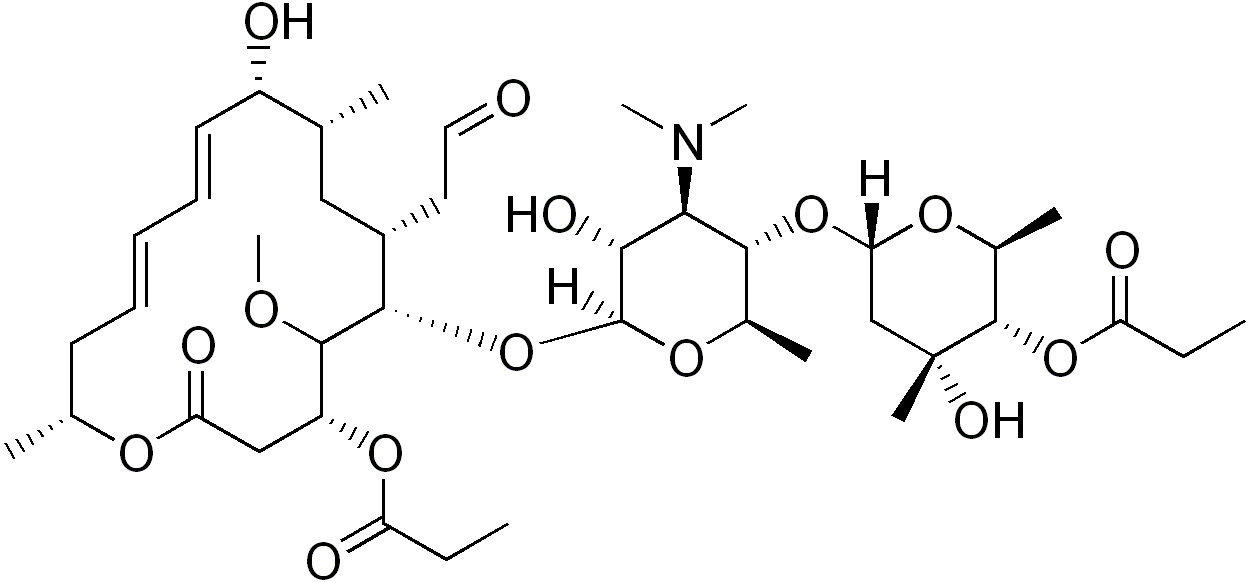

Clinical data
- AHFS/Drugs.com: International Drug Names
- ATC code: J01FA03 (WHO)

Identifiers
- IUPAC name: (2S,3S,4R,6S)-6-{[(2R,3S,4R,5R,6S)-4-(dimethylamino)-5-hydroxy-6-{[(4R,6S,7R,9R,10R,11E,13E,16R)-10-hydroxy-5-methoxy-9,16-dimethyl-2-oxo-7-(2-oxoethyl)-4-(propanoyloxy)-1-oxacyclohexadeca-11,13-dien-6-yl]oxy}-2-methyloxan-3-yl]oxy}-4-hydroxy-2,4-dimethyloxan-3-yl propanoate
- CAS Number: 35457-80-8
- PubChem CID: 5382853
- ChemSpider: 4445365
- UNII: N34Z0Y5UH7
- KEGG: D01339
- CompTox Dashboard (EPA): DTXSID5045463
- ECHA InfoCard: 100.047.784

Chemical and physical data
- Formula: C_{41}H_{67}NO_{15}
- Molar mass: 813.979 g·mol^{−1}
- 3D model (JSmol): Interactive image
- Melting point: 155 to 156 °C (311 to 313 °F)
- Solubility in water: Soluble in acidic/low pH water; Very soluble in methanol, chloroform, ethyl acetate, benzene, ethyl ether; Almost completely in ethanol(>95.5) mg/mL (20 °C)
- SMILES: O=CC[C@H]3C[C@@H](C)[C@@H](O)/C=C/C=C/C[C@H](OC(=O)C[C@@H](OC(=O)CC)[C@H](OC)[C@H]3O[C@@H]2O[C@@H]([C@@H](O[C@@H]1O[C@H]([C@H](OC(=O)CC)[C@](O)(C1)C)C)[C@H](N(C)C)[C@H]2O)C)C
- InChI: InChI=1S/C41H67NO15/c1-11-30(45)54-29-21-32(47)51-24(4)16-14-13-15-17-28(44)23(3)20-27(18-19-43)37(38(29)50-10)57-40-35(48)34(42(8)9)36(25(5)53-40)56-33-22-41(7,49)39(26(6)52-33)55-31(46)12-2/h13-15,17,19,23-29,33-40,44,48-49H,11-12,16,18,20-22H2,1-10H3/b14-13+,17-15+/t23-,24-,25-,26+,27+,28+,29-,33+,34-,35-,36-,37+,38+,39+,40+,41-/m1/s1; Key:DMUAPQTXSSNEDD-QALJCMCCSA-N

Midecamycin is a macrolide antibiotic that is synthesized from Streptomyces mycarofaciens.

== Physical Properties ==
Its melting point may vary depending on the compound type and the source consulted. For example, the Merck Index gives a melting point of 155-156 Celsius for the A_{1} type while the Japanese Pharmacopoeia reports 153-158 Celsius. The Merck Index also gives a melting point of 122-125 Celsius for the A_{3} type.
