= Cefcapene =

Chemical compound

Clinical data
- Trade names: Flomox
- AHFS/Drugs.com: International Drug Names
- Routes of administration: Oral
- ATC code: J01DD17 (WHO)

Legal status
- Legal status: In general: ℞ (Prescription only)

Identifiers
- IUPAC name: (6R,7R)-3-{[(Aminocarbonyl)oxy]methyl}-7-{(Z)-[2-(2-amino-4-thiazolyl)-1-oxo-2-pentenyl]amino}-8-oxo-5-thia-1-azabicyclo(4.2.0)oct-2-ene-2-carboxylic acid
- CAS Number: 135889-00-8
- PubChem CID: 6436055
- ChemSpider: 4940731
- UNII: 4D5D3422MW
- KEGG: D07638
- ChEBI: CHEBI:131729
- ChEMBL: ChEMBL582912

Chemical and physical data
- Formula: C_{17}H_{19}N_{5}O_{6}S_{2}
- Molar mass: 453.49 g·mol^{−1}
- 3D model (JSmol): Interactive image
- SMILES: O=C2N1/C(=C(\CS[C@@H]1[C@@H]2NC(=O)C(=C/CC)\c3nc(sc3)N)COC(=O)N)C(=O)O
- InChI: InChI=1S/C17H19N5O6S2/c1-2-3-8(9-6-30-16(18)20-9)12(23)21-10-13(24)22-11(15(25)26)7(4-28-17(19)27)5-29-14(10)22/h3,6,10,14H,2,4-5H2,1H3,(H2,18,20)(H2,19,27)(H,21,23)(H,25,26)/b8-3-/t10-,14-/m1/s1; Key:HJJRIJDTIPFROI-NVKITGPLSA-N

Cefcapene (INN) is a third-generation cephalosporin antibiotic.

It was patented in 1985 and approved for medical use in 1997 in Japan, where it is sold under the Tradename Flomox by Shionogi & Co., Ltd. It is also approved and available as a generic in South Korea and China. It is known to cause severe hypocarnitinemia and associated serious hypoglycaemia, seizures, and encephalopathy in children.
