= Cephalosporin =

Class of pharmaceutical drugs

- Drug class
- Core structure of the cephalosporins

Class identifiers
- Use: Bacterial infection
- ATC code: J01D
- Biological target: Penicillin binding proteins

Clinical data
- Drugs.com: Drug Classes

External links
- MeSH: D002511

Legal status

Structure of the classical cephalosporins

The cephalosporins (sg. /ˌsɛfələˈspɔːrɪn, ˌkɛ-, -loʊ-/) are a class of β-lactam antibiotics originally derived from the fungal genus Acremonium, which was previously known as Cephalosporium.

Together with cephamycins, they constitute a subgroup of β-lactam antibiotics called cephems. Cephalosporins were discovered in 1945, and first sold in 1964.

== Discovery ==
The aerobic mold which yielded cephalosporin C was found in the sea near Cagliari, Sardinia, by the Italian pharmacologist Giuseppe Brotzu in July 1945.

== Structure ==
Cephalosporin contains a 6-membered dihydrothiazine ring. Substitutions at position 3 generally affect pharmacology; substitutions at position 7 affect antibacterial activity, but these cases are not always true.

== Medical uses ==
Cephalosporins can be indicated for the prophylaxis and treatment of infections caused by bacteria susceptible to this particular form of antibiotic. First-generation cephalosporins are active predominantly against Gram-positive bacteria, such as Staphylococcus and Streptococcus. They are therefore used mostly for skin and soft tissue infections and the prevention of hospital-acquired surgical infections. Successive generations of cephalosporins have increased activity against Gram-negative bacteria, albeit often with reduced activity against Gram-positive organisms.

The antibiotic may be used for patients who are allergic to penicillin due to the different β-lactam antibiotic structure. The drug is able to be excreted in the urine.

== Side effects ==
Common adverse drug reactions (ADRs) (≥ 1% of patients) associated with the cephalosporin therapy include: diarrhea, nausea, rash, electrolyte disturbances, and pain and inflammation at injection site. Infrequent ADRs (0.1–1% of patients) include vomiting, headache, dizziness, oral and vaginal candidiasis, pseudomembranous colitis, superinfection, eosinophilia, nephrotoxicity, neutropenia, thrombocytopenia, and fever.

=== Allergic hypersensitivity ===
The commonly quoted figure of 10% of patients with allergic hypersensitivity to penicillins or carbapenems also having cross-reactivity with cephalosporins originated from a 1975 study looking at the original cephalosporins, and subsequent "safety first" policy meant this was widely quoted and assumed to apply to all members of the group. Hence, it was commonly stated that they are contraindicated in patients with a history of severe, immediate allergic reactions (urticaria, anaphylaxis, interstitial nephritis, etc.) to penicillins or carbapenems.

The contraindication, however, should be viewed in the light of recent epidemiological work suggesting, for many second-generation (or later) cephalosporins, the cross-reactivity rate with penicillin is much lower, having no significantly increased risk of reactivity over the first generation based on the studies examined. The British National Formulary previously issued blanket warnings of 10% cross-reactivity, but, since the September 2008 edition, suggests, in the absence of suitable alternatives, oral cefixime or cefuroxime and injectable cefotaxime, ceftazidime, and ceftriaxone can be used with caution, but the use of cefaclor, cefadroxil, cefalexin, and cefradine should be avoided. A 2012 literature review similarly finds that the risk is negligible with third- and fourth-generation cephalosporins. The risk with first-generation cephalosporins having similar R1 sidechains was also found to be overestimated, with the real value closer to 1%.

=== MTT side chain ===
MTT and MTDT sidechains

Methylthiotetrazole

Methylthiodioxotriazine

Several cephalosporins are associated with hypoprothrombinemia and a disulfiram-like reaction with ethanol. These include latamoxef (moxalactam), cefmenoxime, cefoperazone, cefamandole, cefmetazole, and cefotetan. This is thought to be due to the methylthiotetrazole side-chain of these cephalosporins, which blocks the enzyme vitamin K epoxide reductase (likely causing hypothrombinemia) and aldehyde dehydrogenase (causing alcohol intolerance). Thus, consumption of alcohol after taking these cephalosporin orally or intravenously is contraindicated, and in severe cases can lead to death. The methylthiodioxotriazine sidechain found in ceftriaxone has a similar effect. Cephalosporins without these structural elements are believed to be safe with alcohol.

== Mechanism of action ==
Cephalosporins are bactericidal and, like other β-lactam antibiotics, disrupt the synthesis of the peptidoglycan layer forming the bacterial cell wall. The peptidoglycan layer is important for cell wall structural integrity. The final transpeptidation step in the synthesis of the peptidoglycan is facilitated by penicillin-binding proteins (PBPs). PBPs bind to the D-Ala-D-Ala at the end of muropeptides (peptidoglycan precursors) to crosslink the peptidoglycan. Beta-lactam antibiotics mimic the D-Ala-D-Ala site, thereby irreversibly inhibiting PBP crosslinking of peptidoglycan.

== Resistance ==
Resistance to cephalosporin antibiotics can involve either reduced affinity of existing PBP components or the acquisition of a supplementary β-lactam-insensitive PBP. Compared to other β-lactam antibiotics (such as penicillins), they are less susceptible to β-lactamases. Currently, some Citrobacter freundii, Enterobacter cloacae, Neisseria gonorrhoeae, and Escherichia coli strains are resistant to cephalosporins. Some Morganella morganii, Proteus vulgaris, Providencia rettgeri, Pseudomonas aeruginosa, Serratia marcescens and Klebsiella pneumoniae strains have also developed resistance to cephalosporins to varying degrees.

== Classification ==
The first cephalosporins were designated first-generation cephalosporins, whereas, later, more extended-spectrum cephalosporins were classified as second-generation cephalosporins. Each newer generation has significantly greater Gram-negative antimicrobial properties than the preceding generation, in most cases with decreased activity against Gram-positive organisms. Fourth-generation cephalosporins, however, have true broad-spectrum activity.

The classification of cephalosporins into "generations" is commonly practised, although the exact categorization is often imprecise. For example, the fourth generation of cephalosporins is not recognized as such in Japan. In Japan, cefaclor is classed as a first-generation cephalosporin, though in the United States it is a second-generation one; and cefbuperazone, cefminox, and cefotetan are classed as second-generation cephalosporins.

=== First generation ===
Cefalotin, cefazolin, cefalexin, cefapirin, cefradine, and cefadroxil are among the drugs belonging to this group.

=== Second generation ===
Cefoxitin, cefuroxime, cefaclor, cefprozil, and cefmetazole are classed as second-generation cephems.

=== Third generation ===
Cefdinir, ceftazidime,cefixime, ceftriaxone, and cefotaxime are classed as third-generation cephalosporins. Flomoxef and latamoxef are in a new, related class called oxacephems.

=== Fourth generation ===
Drugs included in this group are cefepime and cefpirome.

=== Further generations ===
Some state that cephalosporins can be divided into five or even six generations, although the usefulness of this organization system is of limited clinical relevance.

=== Naming ===
Most first-generation cephalosporins were originally spelled "ceph-" in English-speaking countries. This continues to be the preferred spelling in the United States, Australia, and New Zealand, while European countries (including the United Kingdom) have adopted the International Nonproprietary Names, which are always spelled "cef-". Newer first-generation cephalosporins and all cephalosporins of later generations are spelled "cef-", even in the United States.

=== Activity ===
There exist bacteria which cannot be treated with cephalosporins of generations first through fourth:

- Listeria spp.
- Atypicals (including Mycoplasma and Chlamydia)
- MRSA
- Enterococci

Fifth-generation cephalosporins (e.g. ceftaroline) are effective against MRSA, Listeria spp., and Enterococcus faecalis.

=== Overview table ===
Generation	Name			Approval status	Coverage	Description
Generation	Common	Alternate name or spelling	Brand	Approval status	Coverage	Description
(#) = noncephalosporins similar to generation #				H, human; V, veterinary; W, withdrawn; P, Pseudomonas; MR, methicillin-resistant Staphylococcus aureus; An, anaerobe		
1	Cefalexin	cephalexin	Keflex	H V		Gram-positive: Activity against penicillinase-producing, methicillin-susceptible staphylococci and streptococci (though they are not the drugs of choice for such infections). No activity against methicillin-resistant staphylococci or enterococci. Gram-negative: Activity against Proteus mirabilis, some Escherichia coli, and Klebsiella pneumoniae ("PEcK"), but have no activity against Bacteroides fragilis, Pseudomonas, Acinetobacter, Enterobacter, indole-positive Proteus, or Serratia.
1	Cefadroxil	cefadroxyl	Duricef	H		Gram-positive: Activity against penicillinase-producing, methicillin-susceptible staphylococci and streptococci (though they are not the drugs of choice for such infections). No activity against methicillin-resistant staphylococci or enterococci. Gram-negative: Activity against Proteus mirabilis, some Escherichia coli, and Klebsiella pneumoniae ("PEcK"), but have no activity against Bacteroides fragilis, Pseudomonas, Acinetobacter, Enterobacter, indole-positive Proteus, or Serratia.
1	Cefazolin	cephazolin	Ancef, Kefzol	H		Gram-positive: Activity against penicillinase-producing, methicillin-susceptible staphylococci and streptococci (though they are not the drugs of choice for such infections). No activity against methicillin-resistant staphylococci or enterococci. Gram-negative: Activity against Proteus mirabilis, some Escherichia coli, and Klebsiella pneumoniae ("PEcK"), but have no activity against Bacteroides fragilis, Pseudomonas, Acinetobacter, Enterobacter, indole-positive Proteus, or Serratia.
1	Cefapirin	cephapirin	Cefadryl	V		Gram-positive: Activity against penicillinase-producing, methicillin-susceptible staphylococci and streptococci (though they are not the drugs of choice for such infections). No activity against methicillin-resistant staphylococci or enterococci. Gram-negative: Activity against Proteus mirabilis, some Escherichia coli, and Klebsiella pneumoniae ("PEcK"), but have no activity against Bacteroides fragilis, Pseudomonas, Acinetobacter, Enterobacter, indole-positive Proteus, or Serratia.
1	Cefacetrile	cephacetrile				Gram-positive: Activity against penicillinase-producing, methicillin-susceptible staphylococci and streptococci (though they are not the drugs of choice for such infections). No activity against methicillin-resistant staphylococci or enterococci. Gram-negative: Activity against Proteus mirabilis, some Escherichia coli, and Klebsiella pneumoniae ("PEcK"), but have no activity against Bacteroides fragilis, Pseudomonas, Acinetobacter, Enterobacter, indole-positive Proteus, or Serratia.
1	Cefaloglycin	cephaloglycin				Gram-positive: Activity against penicillinase-producing, methicillin-susceptible staphylococci and streptococci (though they are not the drugs of choice for such infections). No activity against methicillin-resistant staphylococci or enterococci. Gram-negative: Activity against Proteus mirabilis, some Escherichia coli, and Klebsiella pneumoniae ("PEcK"), but have no activity against Bacteroides fragilis, Pseudomonas, Acinetobacter, Enterobacter, indole-positive Proteus, or Serratia.
1	Cefalonium	cephalonium				Gram-positive: Activity against penicillinase-producing, methicillin-susceptible staphylococci and streptococci (though they are not the drugs of choice for such infections). No activity against methicillin-resistant staphylococci or enterococci. Gram-negative: Activity against Proteus mirabilis, some Escherichia coli, and Klebsiella pneumoniae ("PEcK"), but have no activity against Bacteroides fragilis, Pseudomonas, Acinetobacter, Enterobacter, indole-positive Proteus, or Serratia.
1	Cefaloridine	cephaloradine				Gram-positive: Activity against penicillinase-producing, methicillin-susceptible staphylococci and streptococci (though they are not the drugs of choice for such infections). No activity against methicillin-resistant staphylococci or enterococci. Gram-negative: Activity against Proteus mirabilis, some Escherichia coli, and Klebsiella pneumoniae ("PEcK"), but have no activity against Bacteroides fragilis, Pseudomonas, Acinetobacter, Enterobacter, indole-positive Proteus, or Serratia.
1	Cefalotin	cephalothin	Keflin			Gram-positive: Activity against penicillinase-producing, methicillin-susceptible staphylococci and streptococci (though they are not the drugs of choice for such infections). No activity against methicillin-resistant staphylococci or enterococci. Gram-negative: Activity against Proteus mirabilis, some Escherichia coli, and Klebsiella pneumoniae ("PEcK"), but have no activity against Bacteroides fragilis, Pseudomonas, Acinetobacter, Enterobacter, indole-positive Proteus, or Serratia.
1	Cefatrizine					Gram-positive: Activity against penicillinase-producing, methicillin-susceptible staphylococci and streptococci (though they are not the drugs of choice for such infections). No activity against methicillin-resistant staphylococci or enterococci. Gram-negative: Activity against Proteus mirabilis, some Escherichia coli, and Klebsiella pneumoniae ("PEcK"), but have no activity against Bacteroides fragilis, Pseudomonas, Acinetobacter, Enterobacter, indole-positive Proteus, or Serratia.
1	Cefazaflur					Gram-positive: Activity against penicillinase-producing, methicillin-susceptible staphylococci and streptococci (though they are not the drugs of choice for such infections). No activity against methicillin-resistant staphylococci or enterococci. Gram-negative: Activity against Proteus mirabilis, some Escherichia coli, and Klebsiella pneumoniae ("PEcK"), but have no activity against Bacteroides fragilis, Pseudomonas, Acinetobacter, Enterobacter, indole-positive Proteus, or Serratia.
1	Cefazedone					Gram-positive: Activity against penicillinase-producing, methicillin-susceptible staphylococci and streptococci (though they are not the drugs of choice for such infections). No activity against methicillin-resistant staphylococci or enterococci. Gram-negative: Activity against Proteus mirabilis, some Escherichia coli, and Klebsiella pneumoniae ("PEcK"), but have no activity against Bacteroides fragilis, Pseudomonas, Acinetobacter, Enterobacter, indole-positive Proteus, or Serratia.
1	Cefradine	cephradine	Velosef			Gram-positive: Activity against penicillinase-producing, methicillin-susceptible staphylococci and streptococci (though they are not the drugs of choice for such infections). No activity against methicillin-resistant staphylococci or enterococci. Gram-negative: Activity against Proteus mirabilis, some Escherichia coli, and Klebsiella pneumoniae ("PEcK"), but have no activity against Bacteroides fragilis, Pseudomonas, Acinetobacter, Enterobacter, indole-positive Proteus, or Serratia.
1	Cefroxadine					Gram-positive: Activity against penicillinase-producing, methicillin-susceptible staphylococci and streptococci (though they are not the drugs of choice for such infections). No activity against methicillin-resistant staphylococci or enterococci. Gram-negative: Activity against Proteus mirabilis, some Escherichia coli, and Klebsiella pneumoniae ("PEcK"), but have no activity against Bacteroides fragilis, Pseudomonas, Acinetobacter, Enterobacter, indole-positive Proteus, or Serratia.
1	Ceftezole					Gram-positive: Activity against penicillinase-producing, methicillin-susceptible staphylococci and streptococci (though they are not the drugs of choice for such infections). No activity against methicillin-resistant staphylococci or enterococci. Gram-negative: Activity against Proteus mirabilis, some Escherichia coli, and Klebsiella pneumoniae ("PEcK"), but have no activity against Bacteroides fragilis, Pseudomonas, Acinetobacter, Enterobacter, indole-positive Proteus, or Serratia.
2	Cefuroxime		Altacef, Zefu, Zinnat, Zinacef, Ceftin, Biofuroksym, Xorimax	H		Gram-positive: Less than first-generation. Gram-negative: Greater than first-generation: HEN Haemophilus influenzae, Enterobacter aerogenes and some Neisseria + the PEcK described above.
2	Cefprozil	cefproxil	Cefzil	H		Gram-positive: Less than first-generation. Gram-negative: Greater than first-generation: HEN Haemophilus influenzae, Enterobacter aerogenes and some Neisseria + the PEcK described above.
2	Cefaclor		Ceclor, Distaclor, Keflor, Raniclor	H		Gram-positive: Less than first-generation. Gram-negative: Greater than first-generation: HEN Haemophilus influenzae, Enterobacter aerogenes and some Neisseria + the PEcK described above.
2	Cefonicid		Monocid			Gram-positive: Less than first-generation. Gram-negative: Greater than first-generation: HEN Haemophilus influenzae, Enterobacter aerogenes and some Neisseria + the PEcK described above.
2	Cefuzonam					Gram-positive: Less than first-generation. Gram-negative: Greater than first-generation: HEN Haemophilus influenzae, Enterobacter aerogenes and some Neisseria + the PEcK described above.
2	Cefamandole			W		Gram-positive: Less than first-generation. Gram-negative: Greater than first-generation: HEN Haemophilus influenzae, Enterobacter aerogenes and some Neisseria + the PEcK described above.
(2)	Cefoxitin		Mefoxin	H	An	Cephamycins sometimes grouped with second-generation cephalosporins
(2)	Cefotetan		Cefotan	H	An	Cephamycins sometimes grouped with second-generation cephalosporins
(2)	Cefmetazole		Zefazone		An	Cephamycins sometimes grouped with second-generation cephalosporins
(2)	Cefminox					Cephamycins sometimes grouped with second-generation cephalosporins
(2)	Cefbuperazone					Cephamycins sometimes grouped with second-generation cephalosporins
(2)	Cefotiam		Pansporin			Cephamycins sometimes grouped with second-generation cephalosporins
(2)	Loracarbef		Lorabid			The carbacephem analog of cefaclor
3	Cefdinir		Sefdin, Zinir, Omnicef, Kefnir	H		Gram-positive: Some members of this group (in particular, those available in an oral formulation, and those with antipseudomonal activity) have decreased activity against gram-positive organisms. Activity against staphylococci and streptococci is less with the third-generation compounds than with the first- and second-generation compounds. Gram-negative: Third-generation cephalosporins have a broad spectrum of activity and further increased activity against gram-negative organisms. They may be particularly useful in treating hospital-acquired infections, although increasing levels of extended-spectrum beta-lactamases are reducing the clinical utility of this class of antibiotics. They are also able to penetrate the central nervous system, making them useful against meningitis caused by pneumococci, meningococci, H. influenzae, and susceptible E. coli, Klebsiella, and penicillin-resistant N. gonorrhoeae. Since August 2012, the third-generation cephalosporin, ceftriaxone, is the only recommended treatment for gonorrhea in the United States (in addition to azithromycin or doxycycline for concurrent Chlamydia treatment). Cefixime is no longer recommended as a first-line treatment due to evidence of decreasing susceptibility.
3	Ceftriaxone		Rocephin	H		
3	Ceftazidime		Meezat, Fortum, Fortaz	H	P	
3	Cefixime		Fixx, Zifi, Suprax	H		
3	Cefpodoxime		Vantin, PECEF, Simplicef	H V		
3	Ceftiofur		Naxcel, Excenel	H V		
3	Cefotaxime		Claforan	H		
3	Ceftizoxime		Cefizox	H		
3	Cefditoren		Zostom-O	H		
3	Ceftibuten		Cedax	H		
3	Cefovecin		Convenia	V		
3	Cefdaloxime					
3	Cefcapene					
3	Cefetamet					
3	Cefmenoxime					
3	Cefodizime					
3	Cefpimizole					
3	Cefteram					
3	Ceftiolene					
3	Cefoperazone		Cefobid	W	P	
(3)	Latamoxef	moxalactam		W		An oxacephem sometimes grouped with third-generation cephalosporins
4	Cefepime		Maxipime	H	P	Gram-positive: They are extended-spectrum agents with similar activity against Gram-positive organisms as first-generation cephalosporins. Gram-negative: Fourth-generation cephalosporins are zwitterions that can penetrate the outer membrane of Gram-negative bacteria. They also have a greater resistance to β-lactamases than the third-generation cephalosporins. Many can cross the blood–brain barrier and are effective in meningitis. They are also used against Pseudomonas aeruginosa. Cefiderocol has been called a fourth-generation cephalosporin by only one source as of November 2019.
4	Cefiderocol		Fetroja	H		
4	Cefquinome			V		
4	Cefclidine					
4	Cefluprenam					
4	Cefoselis					
4	Cefozopran					
4	Cefpirome		Cefrom			
(4)	Flomoxef					An oxacephem sometimes grouped with fourth-generation cephalosporins
5	Ceftaroline			H	MR	Ceftobiprole has been described as "fifth-generation" cephalosporin, though acceptance for this terminology is not universal. Ceftobiprole has anti-pseudomonal activity and appears to be less susceptible to development of resistance. Ceftaroline has also been described as "fifth-generation" cephalosporin, but does not have the activity against Pseudomonas aeruginosa or vancomycin-resistant enterococci that ceftobiprole has. Ceftolozane is an option for the treatment of complicated intra-abdominal infections and complicated urinary tract infections. It is combined with the β-lactamase inhibitor tazobactam, as multi-drug resistant bacterial infections will generally show resistance to all β-lactam antibiotics unless this enzyme is inhibited.
5	Ceftolozane		Zerbaxa	H		
5	Ceftobiprole				MR	
?	Cefaloram					These cephems have progressed far enough to be named, but have not been assigned to a particular generation. Nitrocefin is a chromogenic cephalosporin substrate, and is used for detection of β-lactamases.
?	Cefaparole					These cephems have progressed far enough to be named, but have not been assigned to a particular generation. Nitrocefin is a chromogenic cephalosporin substrate, and is used for detection of β-lactamases.
?	Cefcanel					These cephems have progressed far enough to be named, but have not been assigned to a particular generation. Nitrocefin is a chromogenic cephalosporin substrate, and is used for detection of β-lactamases.
?	Cefedrolor					These cephems have progressed far enough to be named, but have not been assigned to a particular generation. Nitrocefin is a chromogenic cephalosporin substrate, and is used for detection of β-lactamases.
?	Cefempidone					These cephems have progressed far enough to be named, but have not been assigned to a particular generation. Nitrocefin is a chromogenic cephalosporin substrate, and is used for detection of β-lactamases.
?	Cefetrizole					These cephems have progressed far enough to be named, but have not been assigned to a particular generation. Nitrocefin is a chromogenic cephalosporin substrate, and is used for detection of β-lactamases.
?	Cefivitril					These cephems have progressed far enough to be named, but have not been assigned to a particular generation. Nitrocefin is a chromogenic cephalosporin substrate, and is used for detection of β-lactamases.
?	Cefmatilen					These cephems have progressed far enough to be named, but have not been assigned to a particular generation. Nitrocefin is a chromogenic cephalosporin substrate, and is used for detection of β-lactamases.
?	Cefmepidium					These cephems have progressed far enough to be named, but have not been assigned to a particular generation. Nitrocefin is a chromogenic cephalosporin substrate, and is used for detection of β-lactamases.
?	Cefoxazole					These cephems have progressed far enough to be named, but have not been assigned to a particular generation. Nitrocefin is a chromogenic cephalosporin substrate, and is used for detection of β-lactamases.
?	Cefrotil					These cephems have progressed far enough to be named, but have not been assigned to a particular generation. Nitrocefin is a chromogenic cephalosporin substrate, and is used for detection of β-lactamases.
?	Cefsumide					These cephems have progressed far enough to be named, but have not been assigned to a particular generation. Nitrocefin is a chromogenic cephalosporin substrate, and is used for detection of β-lactamases.
?	Ceftioxide					These cephems have progressed far enough to be named, but have not been assigned to a particular generation. Nitrocefin is a chromogenic cephalosporin substrate, and is used for detection of β-lactamases.
?	Cefuracetime					These cephems have progressed far enough to be named, but have not been assigned to a particular generation. Nitrocefin is a chromogenic cephalosporin substrate, and is used for detection of β-lactamases.
?	Nitrocefin					These cephems have progressed far enough to be named, but have not been assigned to a particular generation. Nitrocefin is a chromogenic cephalosporin substrate, and is used for detection of β-lactamases.

== History ==
Cephalosporin compounds were first isolated from cultures of Acremonium strictum from a sewer in Sardinia in 1948 by Italian scientist Giuseppe Brotzu. He noticed these cultures produced substances that were effective against Salmonella typhi, the cause of typhoid fever, which had β-lactamase. Guy Newton and Edward Abraham at the Sir William Dunn School of Pathology at the University of Oxford isolated cephalosporin C. The cephalosporin nucleus, 7-aminocephalosporanic acid (7-ACA), was derived from cephalosporin C and proved to be analogous to the penicillin nucleus 6-aminopenicillanic acid (6-APA), but it was not sufficiently potent for clinical use. Modification of the 7-ACA side chains resulted in the development of useful antibiotic agents, and the first agent, cefalotin (cephalothin), was launched by Eli Lilly and Company in 1964.
