= Mycobacterium goodii =

Scientific classification
- Domain: Bacteria
- Kingdom: Bacillati
- Phylum: Actinomycetota
- Class: Actinomycetia
- Order: Mycobacteriales
- Family: Mycobacteriaceae
- Genus: Mycobacterium
- Species: M. goodii

Binomial name
- Mycobacterium goodii Brown et al. 1999, ATCC 700504

Species of bacterium

Mycobacterium goodii is an acid-fast bacterial species in the phylum Actinomycetota and the genus Mycobacterium.

== Description ==
M. goodii cells are Gram-positive, nonmotile, acid-fast rods.

=== Colony characteristics ===
Colonies of M. goodii are smooth to mucoid, off-white to cream coloured. in After 10–14 days incubation, 78% of all strains produce a yellow or orange pigment.

=== Physiology ===
Strains of M. goodii show rapid growth on Middlebrook 7H10 and trypticase soy agar at 30 °C, 35 °C and 45 °C within 2–4 days. They are susceptible to the antibiotics amikacin, ethambutol, and sulfamethoxazole but show intermediate susceptibility to ciprofloxacin, doxycycline and tobramycin and variable susceptibility to cefmetazole, cefoxitin and clarithromycin. They are resistant to isoniazid and rifampicin.

== Pathogenesis ==
M. goodii is found in many of the same settings as M. smegmatis and members of the M. fortuitum complex. It can cause post-traumatic wound infections especially those following open fractures and with associated osteomyelitis and chronic lipoid pneumonia.

== Type strain ==
The type strain of M. goodii (Strain MO69 = ATCC 700504 = CIP 106349 = DSM 44492 = JCM 12689) was first isolated from a patient with a post-traumatic osteomyelitis of the heel in the United States.

Mycobacterium goodii was previously known as Mycobacterium smegmatis group 2.
