= C16H19N3O5S =

The molecular formula C_{16}H_{19}N_{3}O_{5}S (molar mass: 365.4 g/mol) may refer to:

- Amoxicillin
- Cefroxadine
- Heparinoid
