= Cefradine =

Chemical compound

Clinical data
- Trade names: Intracef, Velocef
- AHFS/Drugs.com: International Drug Names
- MedlinePlus: a601206
- Routes of administration: Oral, IM, IV
- ATC code: J01DB09 (WHO)

Legal status
- Legal status: In general: ℞ (Prescription only)

Pharmacokinetic data
- Bioavailability: Well absorbed
- Protein binding: <10%
- Metabolism: Nil
- Elimination half-life: 0.9 hours
- Excretion: Renal, unchanged

Identifiers
- IUPAC name: (6R,7R)-7-{[(2R)-2-Amino-2-(1-cyclohexa-1,4-dienyl)acetyl]amino}-3-methyl-8-oxo-5-thia-1-azabicyclo[4.2.0]oct-2-ene-2-carboxylic acid
- CAS Number: 38821-53-3
- PubChem CID: 38103
- IUPHAR/BPS: 4830
- DrugBank: DB01333
- ChemSpider: 34933
- UNII: 9YA6SX5S4D
- KEGG: D00264
- ChEBI: CHEBI:3547
- ChEMBL: ChEMBL1604
- CompTox Dashboard (EPA): DTXSID4022785
- ECHA InfoCard: 100.049.199

Chemical and physical data
- Formula: C_{16}H_{19}N_{3}O_{4}S
- Molar mass: 349.41 g·mol^{−1}
- 3D model (JSmol): Interactive image
- Melting point: 140 to 142 °C (284 to 288 °F) (dec.)
- SMILES: O=C2N1/C(=C(\CS[C@@H]1[C@@H]2NC(=O)[C@@H](C/3=C/C\C=C/C\3)N)C)C(=O)O
- InChI: InChI=1S/C16H19N3O4S/c1-8-7-24-15-11(14(21)19(15)12(8)16(22)23)18-13(20)10(17)9-5-3-2-4-6-9/h2-3,6,10-11,15H,4-5,7,17H2,1H3,(H,18,20)(H,22,23)/t10-,11-,15-/m1/s1; Key:RDLPVSKMFDYCOR-UEKVPHQBSA-N

Cefradine (INN) or cephradine (BAN) is a first generation cephalosporin antibiotic.

== Indications ==
- Respiratory tract infections (such as tonsillitis, pharyngitis, and lobar pneumonia) caused by group A beta-hemolytic streptococci and S. pneumoniae (formerly D. pneumonia). (Note: Penicillin is the usual drug of choice in the treatment and prevention of streptococcal infections, including the prophylaxis of rheumatic fever. Cefuroxime is generally effective in the eradication of streptococci from the nasopharynx)
- Otitis media caused by group A beta-hemolytic streptococci, S. pneumoniae, H. influenzae, and staphylococci.
- Skin and skin structure infections caused by staphylococci (penicillin-susceptible and penicillin-resistant) and beta-hemolytic streptococci.
- Urinary tract infections, including prostatitis, caused by E. coli, P. mirabilis and Klebsiella species.

== Formulations ==
Cefradine is distributed in the form of capsules containing 250 mg or 500 mg, as a syrup containing 250 mg/5 ml, or in vials for injection containing 500 mg or 1 g.

It is not approved by the FDA for use in the United States.

== Synthesis ==
Birch reduction of D-α-phenylglycine led to diene (2). This was N-protected using tert-butoxycarbonylazide and activated for amide formation via the mixed anhydride method using isobutylchloroformate to give 3. Mixed anhydride 3 reacted readily with 7-aminodesacetoxycephalosporanic acid to give, after deblocking, cephradine (5).

Cefradin synthesis:

== Production names ==
The antibiotic is produced under many brand names across the world.

- Bangladesh: Ancef, Ancef forte, Aphrin, Avlosef, Cefadin, Cephadin, Cephran, Cephran-DS, Cusef, Cusef DS, Dicef, Dicef forte, Dolocef, Efrad, Elocef, Extracef, Extracef-DS, Intracef, Kefdrin, Lebac, Lebac Forte, Medicef, Mega-Cef, Megacin, Polycef, Procef, Procef, Procef forte, Rocef, Rocef Forte DS, Sefin, Sefin DS, Sefnin, Sefrad, Sefrad DS, Sefril, Sefril-DS, Sefro, Sefro-HS, Sephar, Sephar-DS, Septa, Sinaceph, SK-Cef, Sk-Cef DS, Supracef and Supracef-F, Torped, Ultrasef, Vecef, Vecef-DS, Velogen, Sinaceph, Velox
- China: Cefradine, Cephradine, Kebili, Saifuding, Shen You, Taididing, Velosef, Xianyi, and Xindadelei
- Colombia: Cefagram, Cefrakov, Cefranil, Cefrex, and Kliacef
- Egypt: Cefadrin, Cefadrine, Cephradine, Cephraforte, Farcosef, Fortecef, Mepadrin, Ultracef, and Velosef
- France: Dexef
- Hong Kong: Cefradine and ChinaQualisef-250
- Indonesia: Dynacef, Velodine, and Velodrom
- Lebanon: Eskacef, Julphacef, and Velosef
- Lithuania: Tafril
- Myanmar: Sinaceph
- Oman: Ceframed, Eskasef, Omadine, and Velocef
- Pakistan: Abidine, Ada-Cef, Ag-cef, Aksosef, Amspor, Anasef, Antimic, Atcosef, Bactocef, Biocef, Biodine, Velora, Velosef
- Peru: Abiocef, Cefradinal, Cefradur, Cefrid, Terbodina II, Velocef, Velomicin
- Philippines: Altozef, Racep, Senadex, Solphride, Yudinef, Zefadin, Zefradil, and Zolicef
- Poland: Tafril
- Portugal: Cefalmin, Cefradur
- South Africa: Cefril A
- South Korea: Cefradine and Tricef
- Taiwan: Cefadin, Cefamid, Cefin, Cekodin, Cephradine, Ceponin, Lacef, Licef-A, Lisacef, Lofadine, Recef, S-60, Sefree, Sephros, Topcef, Tydine, Unifradine, and U-Save
- (United Kingdom) UK: Cefradune (Kent)
- Vietnam: Eurosefro and Incef

== See also ==
- Cephapirin
- Cephacetrile
- Cefamandole
- Ampicillin (Has the same chemical formula)
