= Cephalosporin-C deacetylase =

Class of enzymes

Identifiers
- EC no.: 3.1.1.41
- CAS no.: 52227-71-1

Databases
- BRENDA: enzyme data
- ExPASy: NiceZyme view
- KEGG: enzyme entry
- MetaCyc: metabolic pathway
- Rhea: reactions
- PDB structures: RCSB PDB PDBe PDBsum
- Gene Ontology: AmiGO / QuickGO
Search
- PMC: articles
- PubMed: articles
- NCBI: proteins

Cephalosporin-C deacetylase (EC 3.1.1.41) is an enzyme that catalyzes the reaction

cephalosporin C
H_{2}O
CH_{3}CO_{2}H
deacetylcephalosporin C

The enzyme characterised from the fungus Cephalosporium sp. M8650 hydrolyses cephalosporin C to deacetylcephalosporin C and acetic acid. This reaction has been used in the large-scale production of deacetylcephalosporin C and related compounds from available intermediates including 7-aminocephalosporanic acid.

This enzyme is a hydrolase, specifically one acting on carboxylic ester bonds. The systematic name is cephalosporin-C acetylhydrolase. Other names in common use include cephalosporin C acetyl-hydrolase, cephalosporin C acetylase, cephalosporin acetylesterase, cephalosporin C acetylesterase, cephalosporin C acetyl-esterase, and cephalosporin C deacetylase.

== Structural studies ==
As of late 2007, 4 structures have been solved for this class of enzymes, with PDB accession codes PDB: 1L7A, PDB: 1ODS, PDB: 1ODT, and PDB: 1VLQ.
