= CEG =

CEG or Ceg may refer to:

- Conservative Europe Group, a British political group affiliated to the Conservative Party
- Contender Entertainment Group, a British former media company
- College of Engineering, Guindy, a college in Chennai, India
- Constellation Energy, an American energy company
- Corvette Evolution GT, a PlayStation 2 and Nintendo DS video game
- Cefaloglycin, an antibiotic medication
- Hawarden Airport (IATA code: CEG), an airport in Wales, United Kingdom
- Customer experience guidelines, a set of recommendations to improve customer satisfaction
- Ceg, a Turkish rapper
