= Cefonicid =

Chemical compound

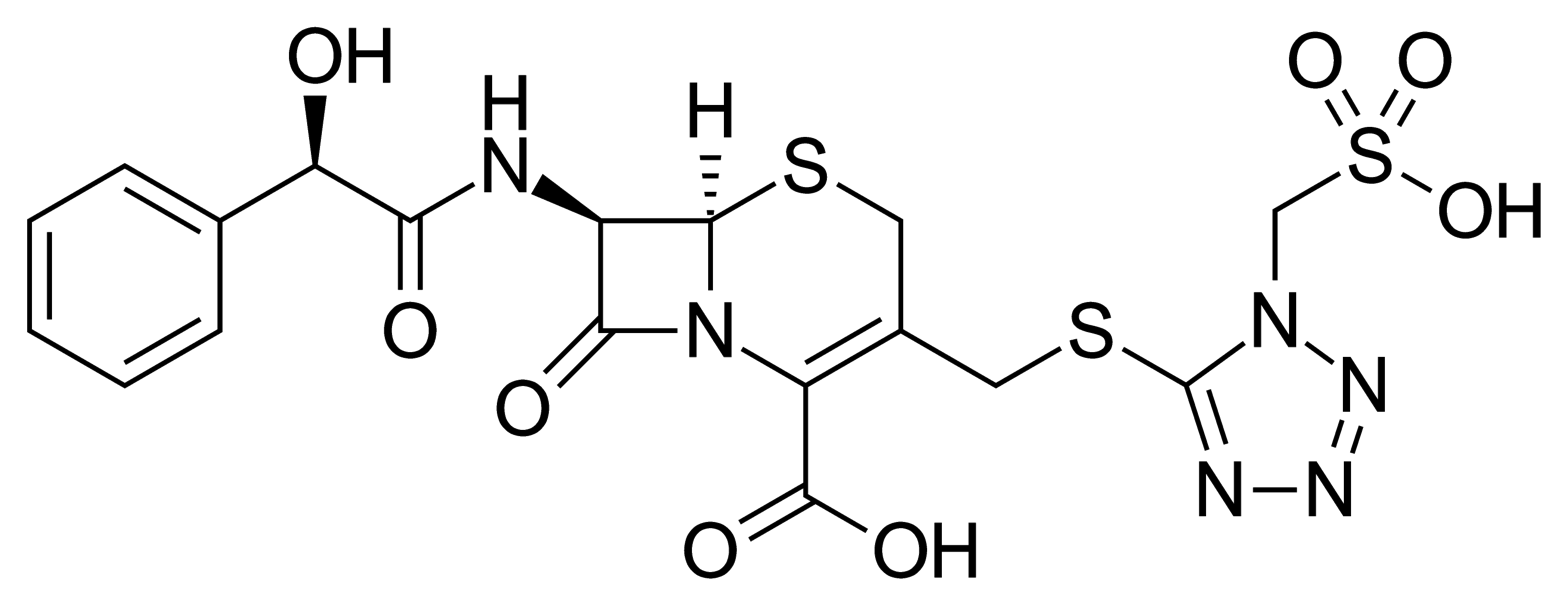

Clinical data
- AHFS/Drugs.com: Micromedex Detailed Consumer Information
- MedlinePlus: a601206
- ATC code: J01DC06 (WHO)

Identifiers
- IUPAC name: (6R,7R)-7-[(2R)-2-hydroxy-2-phenylacetyl)amino]-8-oxo- 3-{[1-(sulfomethyl)tetrazol-5-yl]sulfanylmethyl}- 5-thia-1-azabicyclo[4.2.0]oct-2-ene-2-carboxylic acid
- CAS Number: 61270-58-4
- PubChem CID: 43594
- ChemSpider: 39734
- UNII: 6532B86WFG
- KEGG: D07644
- ChEBI: CHEBI:3491
- ChEMBL: ChEMBL1601
- CompTox Dashboard (EPA): DTXSID7022758

Chemical and physical data
- Formula: C_{18}H_{18}N_{6}O_{8}S_{3}
- Molar mass: 542.56 g·mol^{−1}
- 3D model (JSmol): Interactive image
- SMILES: O=C2N1/C(=C(\CS[C@@H]1[C@@H]2NC(=O)[C@H](O)c3ccccc3)CSc4nnnn4CS(=O)(=O)O)C(=O)O
- InChI: InChI=1S/C18H18N6O8S3/c25-13(9-4-2-1-3-5-9)14(26)19-11-15(27)24-12(17(28)29)10(6-33-16(11)24)7-34-18-20-21-22-23(18)8-35(30,31)32/h1-5,11,13,16,25H,6-8H2,(H,19,26)(H,28,29)(H,30,31,32)/t11-,13-,16-/m1/s1; Key:DYAIAHUQIPBDIP-AXAPSJFSSA-N

Cefonicide (or cefonicid) is a cephalosporin antibiotic.

It has a density of 1.92g/cm^{3}.

== Synthesis ==
Injectable semi-synthetic cephalosporin antibiotic related to cefamandole, q.v.

Cefonicid synthesis:

Cefonicid is synthesized conveniently by nucleophilic displacement of the 3-acetoxy moiety of 1 with the appropriately substituted tetrazole thiole 2. The mandelic acid amide C-7 side chain is reminiscent of cefamandole.

== See also ==
- Cefazaflur
