= Cephamycin =

Group of β-lactam antibiotics

Core structure of the cephamycins.

Cephamycins are a group of β-lactam antibiotics. They are very similar to cephalosporins, and the cephamycins are sometimes classified as cephalosporins.

Like cephalosporins, cephamycins are based upon the cephem nucleus. Unlike most cephalosporins, cephamycins are a very efficient antibiotic against anaerobic microbes.

Cephamycins were originally produced by Streptomyces, but synthetic ones have been produced as well.

Cephamycins possess a methoxy group at the 7-alpha position.

In addition, cephamycins have been shown to be stable against extended-spectrum beta-lactamase (ESBL) producing organisms, although their use in clinical practice is lacking for this indication.

== Examples ==
Cephamycins include:

- Cefoxitin
- Cefotetan
- Cefmetazole
