= Cefmatilen =

Chemical compound

Clinical data
- Routes of administration: Oral
- ATC code: none

Identifiers
- IUPAC name: (6R,7R)-7-{[(2Z)-2-(2-amino-1,3-thiazol-4-yl)- 2-(hydroxyimino)acetyl]amino}-8-oxo-3-{[(1H-1,2,3- triazol-4-ylsulfanyl)methyl]sulfanyl}-5-thia-1- azabicyclo[4.2.0]oct-2-ene-2-carboxylic acid
- CAS Number: 140128-74-1 154776-45-1 (HCl · H_{2}O)
- PubChem CID: 9690121
- ChemSpider: 4912110
- UNII: T750UM24H8
- ChEMBL: ChEMBL2104438
- CompTox Dashboard (EPA): DTXSID50161236

Chemical and physical data
- Formula: C_{15}H_{14}N_{8}O_{5}S_{4}
- Molar mass: 514.57 g·mol^{−1}
- 3D model (JSmol): Interactive image
- SMILES: C1C(=C(N2[C@H](S1)[C@@H](C2=O)NC(=O)/C(=N\O)/C3=CSC(=N3)N)C(=O)O)SCSC4=NNN=C4
- InChI: InChI=1S/C15H14N8O5S4/c16-15-18-5(2-30-15)8(21-28)11(24)19-9-12(25)23-10(14(26)27)6(3-29-13(9)23)31-4-32-7-1-17-22-20-7/h1-2,9,13,28H,3-4H2,(H2,16,18)(H,19,24)(H,26,27)(H,17,20,22)/b21-8-/t9-,13-/m1/s1; Key:UEQVTKSAEXANEZ-YCRCPZNHSA-N

Cefmatilen (INN, codenamed S-1090) is an orally-active cephalosporin antibiotic. It was developed in Japan and first described in 1992.

In vitro, cefmatilen is highly active against a variety of Gram-positive and Gram-negative bacteria, including Streptococcus pyogenes and Neisseria gonorrhoeae.
