= Cefaparole =

Chemical compound

Identifiers
- IUPAC name: (6R,7R)-7-{[(2R)-2-Amino-2-(4-hydroxyphenyl)acetyl]amino}-3-{[(5-methyl-1,3,4-thiadiazol-2-yl)sulfanyl]methyl}-8-oxo-5-thia-1-azabicyclo[4.2.0]oct-2-ene-2-carboxylic acid
- CAS Number: 51627-20-4
- PubChem CID: 17397561
- DrugBank: 111
- ChemSpider: 8588813
- UNII: HW64W823GC
- KEGG: D03421
- ChEMBL: ChEMBL2104067
- CompTox Dashboard (EPA): DTXSID801023695
- ECHA InfoCard: 100.052.097

Chemical and physical data
- Formula: C_{19}H_{19}N_{5}O_{5}S_{3}
- Molar mass: 493.57 g·mol^{−1}
- 3D model (JSmol): Interactive image
- SMILES: Cc1nnc(s1)SCC2=C(N3[C@@H]([C@@H](C3=O)NC(=O)[C@@H](c4ccc(cc4)O)N)SC2)C(=O)O
- InChI: InChI=1S/C19H19N5O5S3/c1-8-22-23-19(32-8)31-7-10-6-30-17-13(16(27)24(17)14(10)18(28)29)21-15(26)12(20)9-2-4-11(25)5-3-9/h2-5,12-13,17,25H,6-7,20H2,1H3,(H,21,26)(H,28,29)/t12-,13-,17-/m1/s1; Key:SBUCDZYLTRYMFG-PBFPGSCMSA-N

Cefaparole (cephaparole) is a cephem antibiotic of the cephalosporin subclass that was never marketed.
