= Cefpirome =

Chemical compound

Clinical data
- AHFS/Drugs.com: International Drug Names
- ATC code: J01DE02 (WHO)

Identifiers
- IUPAC name: 1-{[(6R,7R)-7-[(2E)-2-(2-amino-1,3-thiazol-4-yl)-2-(methoxyimino)acetamido]-2-carboxylato-8-oxo-5-thia-1-azabicyclo[4.2.0]oct-2-en-3-yl]methyl}-5H,6H,7H-cyclopenta[b]pyridin-1-ium
- CAS Number: 84957-29-9
- PubChem CID: 6917674
- ChemSpider: 23089536
- UNII: S72Q2F09HY
- KEGG: D07649
- ChEMBL: ChEMBL2106076
- CompTox Dashboard (EPA): DTXSID2048244

Chemical and physical data
- Formula: C_{22}H_{22}N_{6}O_{5}S_{2}
- Molar mass: 514.58 g·mol^{−1}
- 3D model (JSmol): Interactive image
- SMILES: CON=C(c1csc(n1)N)C(=O)NC2C3N(C2=O)C(=C(CS3)C[n+]4cccc5c4CCC5)C(=O)[O-]
- InChI: InChI=1S/C22H22N6O5S2/c1-33-26-15(13-10-35-22(23)24-13)18(29)25-16-19(30)28-17(21(31)32)12(9-34-20(16)28)8-27-7-3-5-11-4-2-6-14(11)27/h3,5,7,10,16,20H,2,4,6,8-9H2,1H3,(H3-,23,24,25,29,31,32)/b26-15-/t16-,20+/m1/s1; Key:DKOQGJHPHLTOJR-XECLGWKCSA-N

Cefpirome is a fourth-generation cephalosporin. Trade names include Cefrom, Keiten, Broact, and Cefir. Cefpirome is considered highly active against Gram-negative bacteria, including Pseudomonas aeruginosa, and Gram-positive bacteria.

== Spectrum of bacterial susceptibility and resistance ==
Bacteroides fragilis, enterococci, Pseudomonas spp. and staphylococci are resistant to cefpirome sulfate, and some Haemophilus spp. and pneumococci have developed resistance to it to varying degrees.
