= Ceftiolene =

Chemical compound

Clinical data
- ATC code: none

Identifiers
- IUPAC name: (6R,7R)-7-([(2Z)-2-(2-amino-1,3-thiazol-4-yl)-2-methoxyiminoacetyl]amino)-3-[(E)-2-([5,6-dioxo-4-(2-oxoethyl)-1H-1,2,4-triazin-3-yl]sulfanyl)ethenyl]-8-oxo-5-thia-1-azabicyclo[4.2.0]oct-2-ene-2-carboxylic acid
- CAS Number: 77360-52-2
- PubChem CID: 6537430
- ChemSpider: 5020599
- UNII: 28TV2P33KF
- ChEBI: CHEBI:140116
- ChEMBL: ChEMBL2106102
- CompTox Dashboard (EPA): DTXSID101024597

Chemical and physical data
- Formula: C_{20}H_{18}N_{8}O_{8}S_{3}
- Molar mass: 594.59 g·mol^{−1}
- 3D model (JSmol): Interactive image
- SMILES: CON=C(C1=CSC(=N1)N)C(=O)NC2C3N(C2=O)C(=C(CS3)C=CSC4=NNC(=O)C(=O)N4CC=O)C(=O)O
- InChI: InChI=1S/C20H18N8O8S3/c1-36-26-10(9-7-39-19(21)22-9)13(30)23-11-15(32)28-12(18(34)35)8(6-38-17(11)28)2-5-37-20-25-24-14(31)16(33)27(20)3-4-29/h2,4-5,7,11,17H,3,6H2,1H3,(H2,21,22)(H,23,30)(H,24,31)(H,34,35)/b5-2+,26-10-/t11-,17-/m1/s1; Key:WJXAHFZIHLTPFR-JLRJEBFFSA-N

Ceftiolene (INN) is a third-generation cephalosporin antibiotic.
