= Cefoselis =

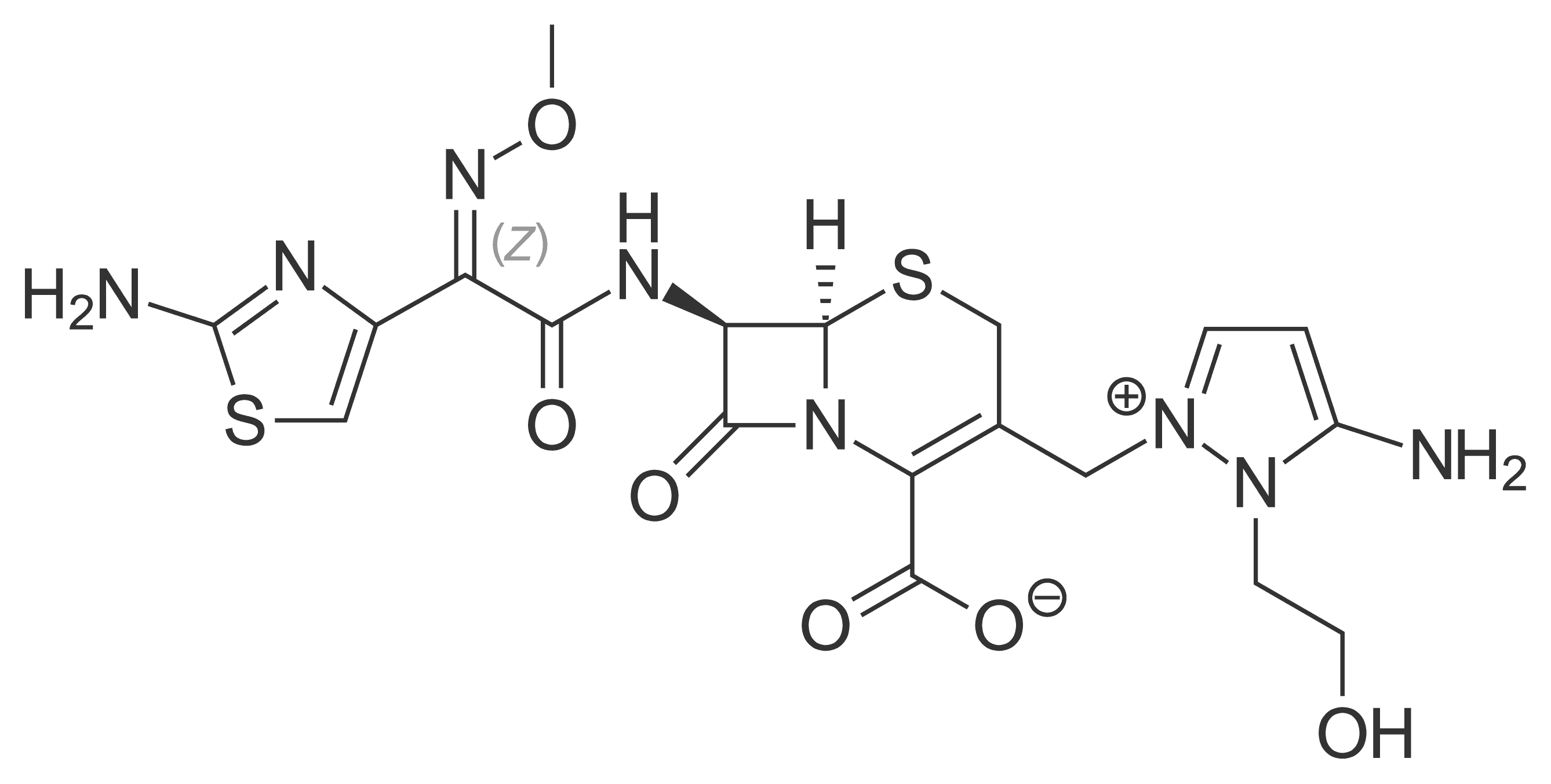

Names
- IUPAC name (6R,7R)-3-[[3-amino-2-(2-hydroxyethyl)pyrazol-1-ium-1-yl]methyl]-7-[[(2Z)-2-(2-amino-1,3-thiazol-4-yl)-2-methoxyiminoacetyl]amino]-8-oxo-5-thia-1-azabicyclo[4.2.0]oct-2-ene-2-carboxylate
- Other names Wincef

Identifiers
CAS Number	122841-10-5
3D model (JSmol)	Interactive image
ChEMBL	ChEMBL2105940
ChemSpider	16736411
PubChem CID	5748845
UNII	0B50MLU3H1
CompTox Dashboard (EPA)	DTXSID3048285
- InChI: InChI=1S/C19H22N8O6S2/c1-33-24-12(10-8-35-19(21)22-10)15(29)23-13-16(30)27-14(18(31)32)9(7-34-17(13)27)6-25-3-2-11(20)26(25)4-5-28/h2-3,8,13,17,20,28H,4-7H2,1H3,(H4,21,22,23,29,31,32)/b24-12-/t13-,17-/m1/s1 Key: BHXLLRXDAYEMPP-SBGRAJFYSA-N; InChI=1/C19H22N8O6S2/c1-33-24-12(10-8-35-19(21)22-10)15(29)23-13-16(30)27-14(18(31)32)9(7-34-17(13)27)6-25-3-2-11(20)26(25)4-5-28/h2-3,8,13,17,20,28H,4-7H2,1H3,(H4,21,22,23,29,31,32)/b24-12-/t13-,17-/m1/s1 Key: BHXLLRXDAYEMPP-SBGRAJFYBO
- SMILES: CO/N=C(\C1=CSC(=N1)N)/C(=O)N[C@H]2[C@@H]3N(C2=O)C(=C(CS3)C[N+]4=CC=C(N4CCO)N)C(=O)[O-]

Properties
Chemical formula	C_{19}H_{22}N_{8}O_{6}S_{2}
Molar mass	522.55 g·mol^{−1}
- Except where otherwise noted, data are given for materials in their standard state (at 25 °C [77 °F], 100 kPa). verify (what is ?) Infobox references

Cefoselis is a fourth generation cephalosporin. It is used extensively in Japan and China in the clinical treatment of various gram positive and gram negative infections. A 2014 study illustrated that Cefoselis is effective at treating respiratory and urinary tract infections.
