= Cefuzonam =

Chemical compound

Clinical data
- ATC code: none

Legal status
- Legal status: In general: ℞ (Prescription only)

Identifiers
- IUPAC name: (6R,7R)-7-([(2Z)-2-(2-amino-1,3-thiazol-4-yl)-2-methoxyiminoacetyl]amino)-8-oxo-3-(thiadiazol-5-ylsulfanylmethyl)-5-thia-1-azabicyclo[4.2.0]oct-2-ene-2-carboxylic acid
- CAS Number: 82219-78-1
- PubChem CID: 6336505
- ChemSpider: 4891670
- UNII: 860MT00T7T
- KEGG: D03432
- ChEMBL: ChEMBL1689069
- CompTox Dashboard (EPA): DTXSID8048282

Chemical and physical data
- Formula: C_{16}H_{15}N_{7}O_{5}S_{4}
- Molar mass: 513.58 g·mol^{−1}
- 3D model (JSmol): Interactive image
- SMILES: CON=C(C1=CSC(=N1)N)C(=O)NC2C3N(C2=O)C(=C(CS3)CSC4=CN=NS4)C(=O)O
- InChI: InChI=1S/C16H15N7O5S4/c1-28-21-9(7-5-31-16(17)19-7)12(24)20-10-13(25)23-11(15(26)27)6(4-30-14(10)23)3-29-8-2-18-22-32-8/h2,5,10,14H,3-4H2,1H3,(H2,17,19)(H,20,24)(H,26,27)/b21-9-/t10-,14-/m1/s1; Key:CXHKZHZLDMQGFF-ZSDSSEDPSA-N

Cefuzonam (INN) is a second-generation cephalosporin antibiotic.
