= Cefpimizole =

Chemical compound

Clinical data
- ATC code: none

Legal status
- Legal status: In general: ℞ (Prescription only)

Identifiers
- IUPAC name: 2-[1-([(6R,7R)-2-carboxy-7-([(2R)-2-[(5-carboxy1H-imidazole-4-carbonyl)amino]-2-phenylacetyl]amino)-8-oxo-5-thia-1-azabicyclo[4.2.0]oct-2-en-3-yl]methyl)pyridin-1-ium-4-yl]ethanesulfonate
- CAS Number: 84880-03-5
- PubChem CID: 11765031
- ChemSpider: 61863
- UNII: 24S58UHU7N
- KEGG: D03427
- ChEMBL: ChEMBL2103902
- CompTox Dashboard (EPA): DTXSID001024675 DTXSID70920069, DTXSID001024675

Chemical and physical data
- Formula: C_{28}H_{26}N_{6}O_{10}S_{2}
- Molar mass: 670.67 g·mol^{−1}
- 3D model (JSmol): Interactive image
- SMILES: C1C(=C(N2[C@H](S1)[C@@H](C2=O)NC(=O)[C@@H](C3=CC=CC=C3)NC(=O)C4=C(N=CN4)C(=O)O)C(=O)[O-])C[N+]5=CC=C(C=C5)CCS(=O)(=O)O
- InChI: InChI=1S/C28H26N6O10S2/c35-23(18(16-4-2-1-3-5-16)31-24(36)19-20(27(38)39)30-14-29-19)32-21-25(37)34-22(28(40)41)17(13-45-26(21)34)12-33-9-6-15(7-10-33)8-11-46(42,43)44/h1-7,9-10,14,18,21,26H,8,11-13H2,(H5-,29,30,31,32,35,36,38,39,40,41,42,43,44)/t18-,21-,26-/m1/s1; Key:LNZMRLHZGOBKAN-KAWPREARSA-N

Cefpimizole (INN) is a third-generation cephalosporin antibiotic.
