= Cetuximab beta =

Medication

Monoclonal antibody
- Type: Whole antibody
- Target: Epidermal growth factor receptor

Clinical data
- Trade names: Enlituo
- Other names: CMAB009
- ATC code: None

Legal status
- Legal status: CN: Rx-only

Cetuximab beta, sold under the brand name Enlituo, is a monoclonal antibody used for the treatment of colorectal cancer.

Cetuximab beta was approved for medical use in China in June 2024.

== Medical uses ==
Cetuximab beta is indicated for use in combination with the FOLFIRI chemotherapy regimen as a first-line treatment for RAS/BRAF wild-type metastatic colorectal cancer.

== Society and culture ==
=== Legal status ===
Cetuximab beta was approved for medical use in China in June 2024.

=== Names ===
Cetuximab beta is the international nonproprietary name.

Cetuximab beta is sold under the brand name Enlituo.
