= Cefalotin =

Chemical compound

Clinical data
- AHFS/Drugs.com: International Drug Names
- MedlinePlus: a682860
- Pregnancy category: AU: A
- Routes of administration: Intravenous
- ATC code: J01DB03 (WHO)

Legal status
- Legal status: AU: S4 (Prescription only); UK: POM (Prescription only)

Pharmacokinetic data
- Bioavailability: n/a
- Protein binding: 65 to 80%
- Metabolism: Hepatic
- Elimination half-life: 30 minutes to 1 hour
- Excretion: Renal

Identifiers
- IUPAC name: (6R,7R)-3-[(acetoxy)methyl]-8-oxo-7-[(2-thienylacetyl)amino]-5-thia-1-azabicyclo[4.2.0]oct-2-ene-2-carboxylic acid
- CAS Number: 153-61-7
- PubChem CID: 6024
- DrugBank: DB00456
- ChemSpider: 5802
- UNII: R72LW146E6
- KEGG: D07635
- ChEBI: CHEBI:124991
- ChEMBL: ChEMBL617
- CompTox Dashboard (EPA): DTXSID4022783
- ECHA InfoCard: 100.005.288

Chemical and physical data
- Formula: C_{16}H_{16}N_{2}O_{6}S_{2}
- Molar mass: 396.43 g·mol^{−1}
- 3D model (JSmol): Interactive image
- Melting point: 160 to 160.5 °C (320.0 to 320.9 °F)
- SMILES: O=C2N1/C(=C(\CS[C@@H]1[C@@H]2NC(=O)Cc3sccc3)COC(=O)C)C(=O)O
- InChI: InChI=1S/C16H16N2O6S2/c1-8(19)24-6-9-7-26-15-12(14(21)18(15)13(9)16(22)23)17-11(20)5-10-3-2-4-25-10/h2-4,12,15H,5-7H2,1H3,(H,17,20)(H,22,23)/t12-,15-/m1/s1; Key:XIURVHNZVLADCM-IUODEOHRSA-N

Cefalotin (INN) /ˌsɛfəˈloʊtɪn/ or cephalothin (USAN) /ˌsɛfəˈloʊθɪn/ is a first-generation cephalosporin antibiotic with broad spectrum antibiotic activity. It was the first cephalosporin marketed (1964) and continues to be widely used. Cefalotin is used for bacterial infections of the respiratory tract, urinary tract, skin, soft tissues, bones and joints, sepsis, peritonitis, osteomyelitis, mastitis, infected wounds, and post-operational infections.

It is an intravenously administered agent with a similar antimicrobial spectrum to cefazolin and the oral agents cefalexin and cefadroxil. Cefalotin sodium is marketed as Keflin (Lilly) and under other trade names.

The compound is a derivative of thiophene-2-acetic acid.
