= Cefmenoxime =

Chemical compound

Clinical data
- AHFS/Drugs.com: International Drug Names
- Routes of administration: Intramuscular, intravenous
- ATC code: J01DD05 (WHO) S01AA31 (WHO), S02AA18 (WHO)

Pharmacokinetic data
- Bioavailability: 100% (given IM)
- Protein binding: 50% to 70%
- Metabolism: Negligible
- Elimination half-life: 1 hour
- Excretion: Kidney, unchanged

Identifiers
- IUPAC name: (6R,7R)-7-{[(2E)-2-(2-amino-1,3-thiazol-4-yl)- 2-methoxyimino-acetyl]amino}-3-[(1-methyltetrazol- 5-yl)sulfanylmethyl]-8-oxo-5-thia-1-azabicyclo[4.2.0] oct-2-ene-2-carboxylic acid
- CAS Number: 65085-01-0
- PubChem CID: 9570757
- DrugBank: DB00267
- ChemSpider: 7845223
- UNII: KBZ4844CXN
- KEGG: D07641
- ChEBI: CHEBI:55490
- ChEMBL: ChEMBL1201224
- CompTox Dashboard (EPA): DTXSID2022755

Chemical and physical data
- Formula: C_{16}H_{17}N_{9}O_{5}S_{3}
- Molar mass: 511.55 g·mol^{−1}
- 3D model (JSmol): Interactive image
- SMILES: O=C2N1/C(=C(\CS[C@@H]1[C@@H]2NC(=O)C(=N\OC)/c3nc(sc3)N)CSc4nnnn4C)C(=O)O
- InChI: InChI=1S/C16H17N9O5S3/c1-24-16(20-22-23-24)33-4-6-3-31-13-9(12(27)25(13)10(6)14(28)29)19-11(26)8(21-30-2)7-5-32-15(17)18-7/h5,9,13H,3-4H2,1-2H3,(H2,17,18)(H,19,26)(H,28,29)/b21-8-/t9-,13-/m1/s1; Key:HJJDBAOLQAWBMH-YCRCPZNHSA-N

Cefmenoxime is a third-generation cephalosporin antibiotic.

== Synthesis ==

The alkylation of ethyl 2-hydroxyimino-3-oxobutanoate (1) with dimethylsulfate gives ethyl (2Z)-2-methoxyimino-3-oxo-butanoate (2). Halogenation with molecular bromine leads to ethyl 4-bromo-2-methoxyimino-3-oxobutanoate (3). Treatment with thiourea gives ethyl (Z)-2-(2-amino-4-thiazolyl)-2-methoxyiminoacetate (4) which is reacted with chloroacetyl chloride to give the amide (5). Saponification with potassium hydroxide gives (6) which is halogenated with phosphorus pentachloride to (7). Amide formation with the cephalosporin intermediate (8) then gives (9). Removal of the protecting group with benzyltriethylammonium bromide yields (10). The tert-butyl ester was deprotected with trifluoroacetic acid to give (11). Lastly, thioether formation with 5-mercapto-1-methyltetrazole (12) completes the synthesis of cefmenoxime.
