= Cefazaflur =

Cephalosporin antibiotic

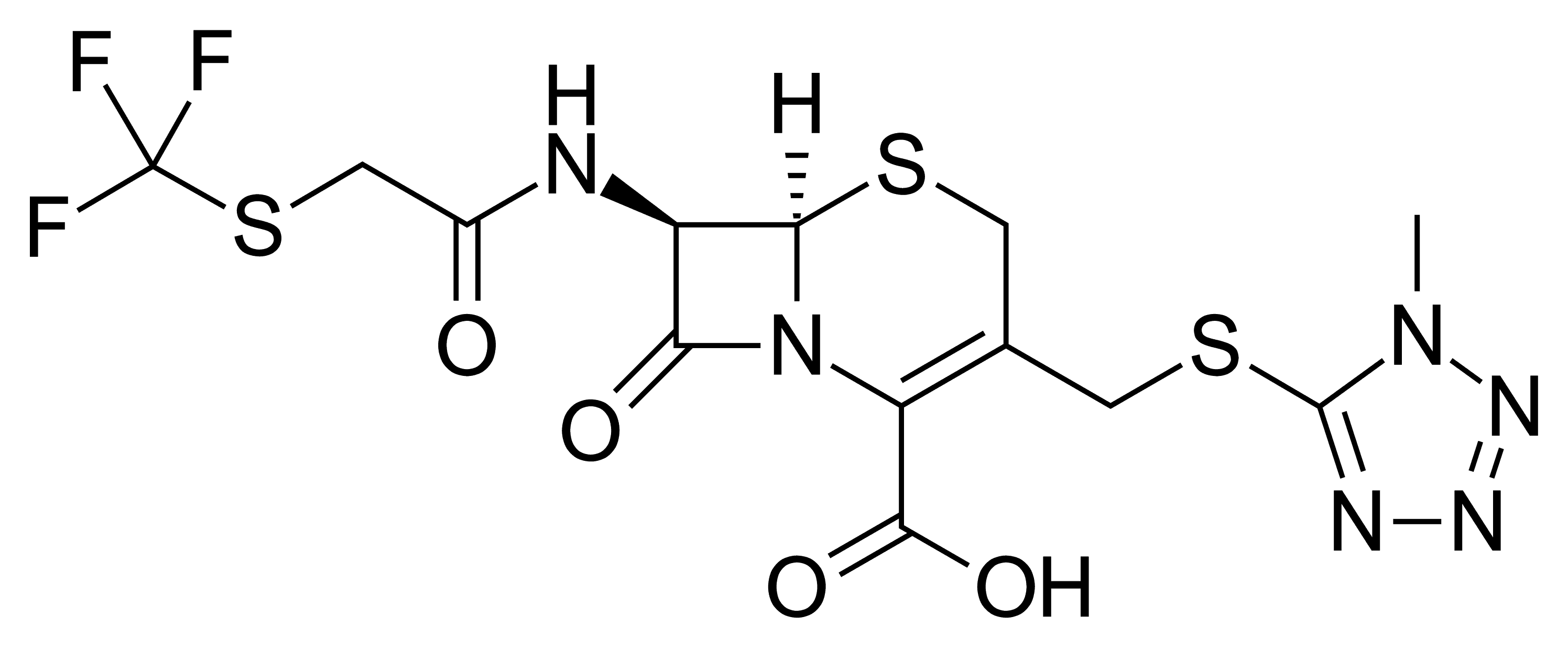

Clinical data
- ATC code: none

Identifiers
- IUPAC name: (6R,7R)-3-[(1-methyltetrazol-5-yl)sulfanylmethyl]-8-oxo-7-([2-(trifluoromethylsulfanyl)acetyl]amino)-5-thia-1-azabicyclo[4.2.0]oct-2-ene-2-carboxylic acid
- CAS Number: 58665-96-6; Sodium: 52123-49-6
- PubChem CID: 40240
- ChemSpider: 36777
- UNII: 97I0692RNT; Sodium: 8NJ5RWV39D
- KEGG: D03422
- ChEMBL: ChEMBL2104456
- CompTox Dashboard (EPA): DTXSID30207368

Chemical and physical data
- Formula: C_{13}H_{13}F_{3}N_{6}O_{4}S_{3}
- Molar mass: 470.46 g·mol^{−1}
- 3D model (JSmol): Interactive image
- SMILES: O=C2N1/C(=C(\CS[C@@H]1[C@@H]2NC(=O)CSC(F)(F)F)CSc3nnnn3C)C(=O)O
- InChI: InChI=1S/C13H13F3N6O4S3/c1-21-12(18-19-20-21)28-3-5-2-27-10-7(9(24)22(10)8(5)11(25)26)17-6(23)4-29-13(14,15)16/h7,10H,2-4H2,1H3,(H,17,23)(H,25,26)/t7-,10-/m1/s1; Key:HGXLJRWXCXSEJO-GMSGAONNSA-N

Cefazaflur (INN) is a first-generation cephalosporin antibiotic.

== Synthesis ==
Cefazaflur stands out among this group of analogues because it lacks an arylamide C-7 side chain (see cephacetrile for another example).

Cefazaflur synthesis:

Cefazaflur is synthesized by reaction of 3-(1-methyl-1H-tetrazol-5-ylthiomethylene)-7-amino-cephem-4-carboxylic acid (1) with trifluoromethylthioacetyl chloride (2).
