= Cefdaloxime =

Chemical compound

Clinical data
- ATC code: None

Identifiers
- CAS Number: 80195-36-4
- PubChem CID: 9571072
- ChemSpider: 7845538
- UNII: 6856HDT30F
- ChEMBL: ChEMBL2104469
- CompTox Dashboard (EPA): DTXSID801001097

Chemical and physical data
- Formula: C_{14}H_{15}N_{5}O_{6}S_{2}
- Molar mass: 413.42 g·mol^{−1}
- 3D model (JSmol): Interactive image
- SMILES: O=C2N1/C(=C(\CS[C@@H]1[C@@H]2NC(=O)C(=N\O)/c3nc(sc3)N)COC)C(=O)O
- InChI: InChI=1S/C14H15N5O6S2/c1-25-2-5-3-26-12-8(11(21)19(12)9(5)13(22)23)17-10(20)7(18-24)6-4-27-14(15)16-6/h4,8,12,24H,2-3H2,1H3,(H2,15,16)(H,17,20)(H,22,23)/b18-7-/t8-,12-/m1/s1; Key:HOGISBSFFHDTRM-GHXIOONMSA-N

Cefdaloxime (INN) is a third-generation cephalosporin antibiotic. Developed in the late 1980's by Hoechst-Roussel Pharmaceuticals Inc., it was never brought to market.
