= Cefodizime =

Chemical compound

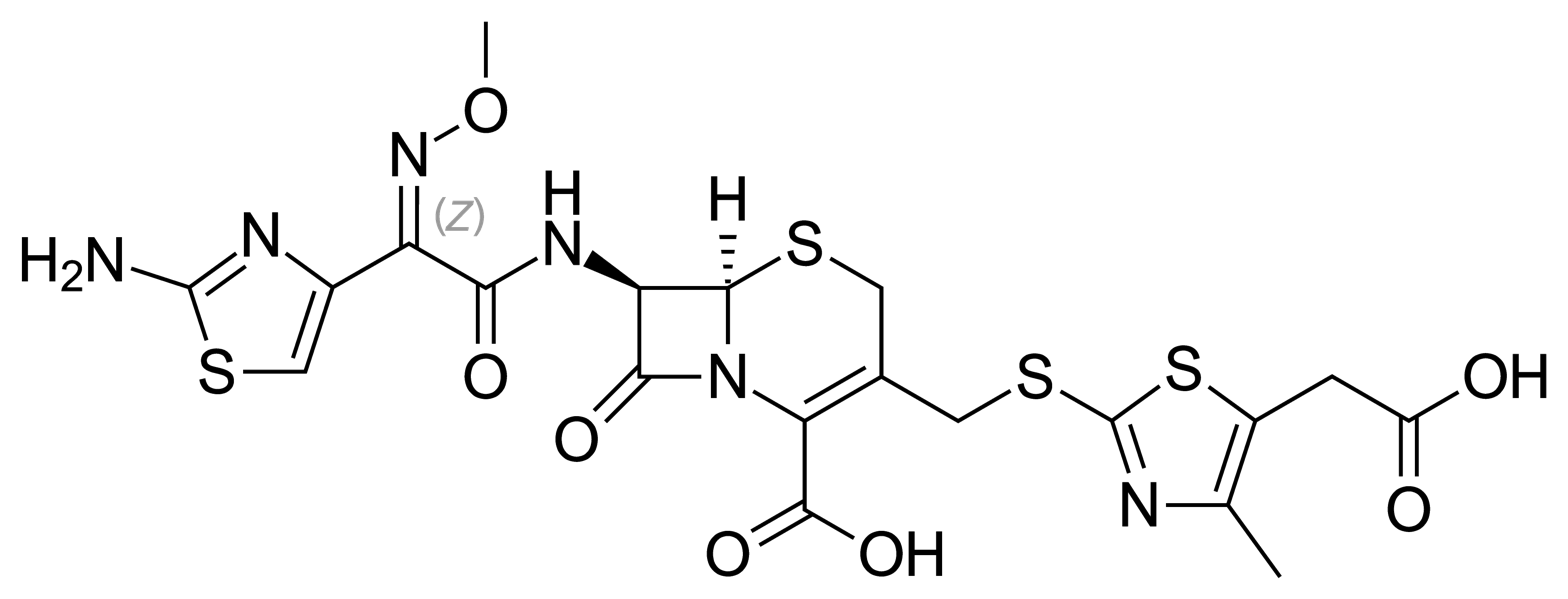

Clinical data
- AHFS/Drugs.com: International Drug Names
- ATC code: J01DD09 (WHO)

Identifiers
- IUPAC name: (6R,7R)-7-{[(2Z)-2-(2-amino-1,3-thiazol-4-yl)-2- methoxyiminoacetyl]amino}-3-{[5-(carboxymethyl)- 4-methyl-1,3-thiazol-2-yl]sulfanylmethyl}-8-oxo- 5-thia-1-azabicyclo[4.2.0]oct-2-ene-2-carboxylic acid
- CAS Number: 69739-16-8
- PubChem CID: 5361871
- ChemSpider: 4514859
- UNII: Z31298J4HQ
- KEGG: D07643
- ChEMBL: ChEMBL1161746
- CompTox Dashboard (EPA): DTXSID2022757
- ECHA InfoCard: 100.148.965

Chemical and physical data
- Formula: C_{20}H_{20}N_{6}O_{7}S_{4}
- Molar mass: 584.66 g·mol^{−1}
- 3D model (JSmol): Interactive image
- SMILES: O=C2N1/C(=C(\CS[C@@H]1[C@@H]2NC(=O)C(=N\OC)/c3nc(sc3)N)CSc4nc(c(s4)CC(=O)O)C)C(=O)O
- InChI: InChI=1S/C20H20N6O7S4/c1-7-10(3-11(27)28)37-20(22-7)36-5-8-4-34-17-13(16(30)26(17)14(8)18(31)32)24-15(29)12(25-33-2)9-6-35-19(21)23-9/h6,13,17H,3-5H2,1-2H3,(H2,21,23)(H,24,29)(H,27,28)(H,31,32)/b25-12-/t13-,17-/m1/s1; Key:XDZKBRJLTGRPSS-BGZQYGJUSA-N

Cefodizime is a 3rd generation cephalosporin antibiotic with broad spectrum activity against aerobic gram positive and gram negative bacteria. Clinically, it has been shown to be effective against upper and lower respiratory tract infections, urinary tract infections, and gonorrhea. Cefodizime is a bactericidal antibiotic that targets penicillin-binding proteins (PBPs) 1A/B, 2, and 3 resulting in the eventual death of the bacterial cell. In vivo experimental models of infection showed that bacterial clearance by this drug is at least as effective compared with other 3rd generation cephalosporins. It has similar adverse effect profile to other 3rd generation cephalosporins as well, mainly being limited to gastrointestinal or dermatological side effects.

It is not currently approved by the FDA for use in the United States.

== Efficacy and susceptibility ==
Cefodizime demonstrated superior clinical efficacy that what could be predicted from its in vitro experimental results. Certain immunomodulatory properties of the drug might account for its increased in vivo activity against specific bacterial species. These immunomodulatory properties stimulate some phagocyte and lymphocyte cellular functions when they have been impaired. It was shown in a 2004 study that cefodizime increased expression of toll-like receptor 4 (TLR-4) in neutrophils stimulated by Klebsiella pneumoniae infection which then affected the production of cytokines in the stimulated cells. A 1992 study conducted in vitro susceptibility studies for cefodizime and found that gram negative bacteria with consistent susceptibility include: Enterobacteriaceae including E. coli, K. pneumoniae, Morganella morganii, Proteus mirabilis, P. vulgaris, Shigella sonnei, Yersinia enterocolitica, Salmonella, Haemophilus influenzae, Moraxella catarrhalis, Neisseria gonorrhoeae, and Neisseria meningitidis. In vitro susceptible gram positive bacteria include: methicillin-sensitive Staphylococcus aureus, and Streptococcus agalactiae, S. pneumoniae and S. pyogenes. Cefodizime was shown to be ineffective in vitro against Enterobacter spp., Pseudomonas aeruginosa, and Xanthomonas maltophilia. Gram positive bacteria it was inactive against include Staphylococcus epidermidis and methicillin-resistant Streptococcus aureus. In this trial, bacteria were considered susceptible if 90% or more of the strains were inhibited by cefodizime concentrations of at least 8 mg/L in vitro.

== Pharmacokinetics ==
Intramuscular cefodizime bioavailability ranges from 90% to 100%. It distributes into many tissues and is approximately 81% bound to plasma proteins, chiefly albumin. The drug reaches minimum inhibitory concentrations approximately 2–3 hours after administration, maintaining it for several hours afterwards. Clearance of cefodizime from the body is predominantly renal, with the majority of the drug excreted unchanged within the first 12 hours. More specifically, cefodizime is mainly cleared via glomerular filtration in the kidney, in addition to some tubular secretion. In patients with normal renal function, the terminal phase elimination half-life is approximately 3.5 hours.

== Adverse effects ==
Cefodizime has been shown to be generally well tolerated in drug trials and its adverse effects are mainly gastrointestinal or dermatological. Gastrointestinal adverse effects were observed in 2.4% of patients during clinical trials and included: diarrhea, nausea, vomiting, and elevated transaminases. Allergic symptoms were observed in 1.1% of patients and include: exanthema, urticaria, and pruritus. Other adverse effects observed include local site reactions, pain at site of injection, and phlebitis.

== Administration ==
Cefodizime is available as an intramuscular injection or as an intravenous bolus or infusion and is usually given 1 or 2 times a day. In clinical trials, the most frequently used adult dosages ranged from 2 grams to 4 grams IM or IV per day given as a single dose or in 2 divided doses.
