= Cefsumide =

Names
- IUPAC name 7β-{2-[3-(Methanesulfonamido)phenyl]-L-glycinamido}-3-methyl-3,4-didehydrocepham-4-carboxylic acid
- Systematic IUPAC name (6R,7R)-7-{(2R)-2-Amino-2-[3-(methanesulfonamido)phenyl]acetamido}-3-methyl-8-oxo-5-thia-1-azabicyclo[4.2.0]oct-2-ene-2-carboxylic acid

Identifiers
CAS Number	54818-11-0
3D model (JSmol)	Interactive image
ChEMBL	ChEMBL2375142
ChemSpider	61968
PubChem CID	68718
UNII	3642W81J7A
CompTox Dashboard (EPA)	DTXSID301023907
- InChI: InChI=1S/C17H20N4O6S2/c1-8-7-28-16-12(15(23)21(16)13(8)17(24)25)19-14(22)11(18)9-4-3-5-10(6-9)20-29(2,26)27/h3-6,11-12,16,20H,7,18H2,1-2H3,(H,19,22)(H,24,25)/t11-,12-,16-/m1/s1 Key: OFKRKCHCYWQZLY-XHBSWPGZSA-N; InChI=1/C17H20N4O6S2/c1-8-7-28-16-12(15(23)21(16)13(8)17(24)25)19-14(22)11(18)9-4-3-5-10(6-9)20-29(2,26)27/h3-6,11-12,16,20H,7,18H2,1-2H3,(H,19,22)(H,24,25)/t11-,12-,16-/m1/s1 Key: OFKRKCHCYWQZLY-XHBSWPGZBS
- SMILES: O=C2N1/C(=C(\CS[C@@H]1[C@@H]2NC(=O)[C@@H](c3cccc(NS(=O)(=O)C)c3)N)C)C(=O)O

Properties
Chemical formula	C_{17}H_{20}N_{4}O_{6}S_{2}
Molar mass	440.49 g·mol^{−1}
- Except where otherwise noted, data are given for materials in their standard state (at 25 °C [77 °F], 100 kPa). Infobox references

Cefsumide is an antibiotic of the cephalosporin group.
