= Cefluprenam =

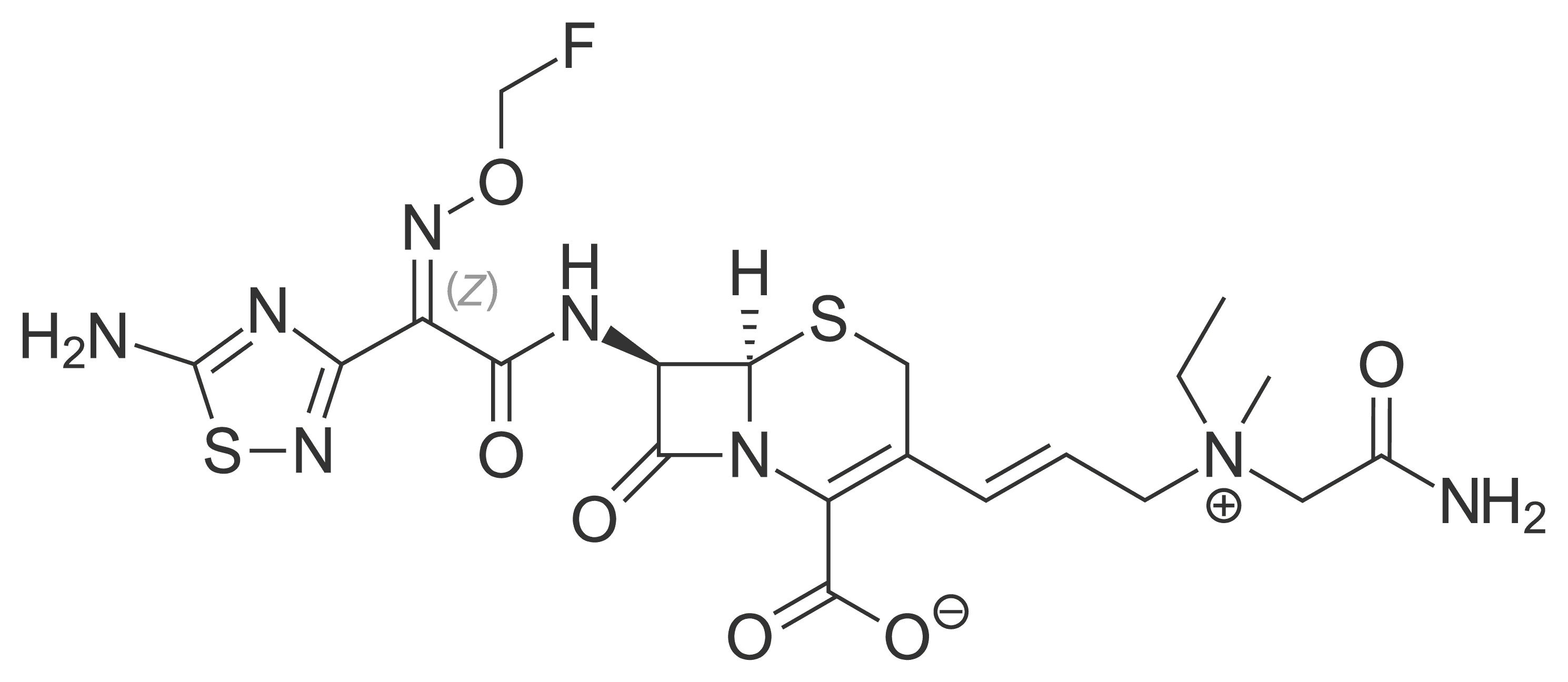

Names
- IUPAC name (6R,7R)-3-[(E)-3-[(2-amino-2-oxoethyl)-ethyl-methylazaniumyl]prop-1-enyl]-7-[[(2Z)-2-(5-amino-1,2,4-thiadiazol-3-yl)-2-(fluoromethoxyimino)acetyl]amino]-8-oxo-5-thia-1-azabicyclo[4.2.0]oct-2-ene-2-carboxylate
- Other names Antibiotic E 1077

Identifiers
CAS Number	116853-25-9
3D model (JSmol)	Interactive image
ChEMBL	ChEMBL2074822
ChemSpider	5020189
KEGG	D01054
PubChem CID	6536774
UNII	098633Q42P
CompTox Dashboard (EPA)	DTXSID001029568
- InChI: InChI=1S/C20H25FN8O6S2/c1-3-29(2,7-11(22)30)6-4-5-10-8-36-18-13(17(32)28(18)14(10)19(33)34)24-16(31)12(26-35-9-21)15-25-20(23)37-27-15/h4-5,13,18H,3,6-9H2,1-2H3,(H5-,22,23,24,25,27,30,31,33,34)/b5-4+,26-12-/t13-,18-,29?/m1/s1 Key: XAKKNLNAJBNLPC-MAYKBZFQSA-N; InChI=1/C20H25FN8O6S2/c1-3-29(2,7-11(22)30)6-4-5-10-8-36-18-13(17(32)28(18)14(10)19(33)34)24-16(31)12(26-35-9-21)15-25-20(23)37-27-15/h4-5,13,18H,3,6-9H2,1-2H3,(H5-,22,23,24,25,27,30,31,33,34)/b5-4+,26-12-/t13-,18-,29?/m1/s1 Key: XAKKNLNAJBNLPC-MAYKBZFQBE
- SMILES: O=C2N1/C(=C(/C=C/C[N+](CC(=O)N)(CC)C)CS[C@@H]1[C@@H]2NC(=O)C(=N\OCF)/c3nc(sn3)N)C([O-])=O

Properties
Chemical formula	C_{20}H_{25}FN_{8}O_{6}S_{2}
Molar mass	556.59 g·mol^{−1}
- Except where otherwise noted, data are given for materials in their standard state (at 25 °C [77 °F], 100 kPa). verify (what is ?) Infobox references

Cefluprenam is a fourth generation cephalosporin. It was developed in the early 1990's by Eisai, though was never marketed. A 1997 clinical trial illustrated that Cefluprenam is highly effective against bacterial pneumonia.
