= Cedelizumab =

Monoclonal antibody

Monoclonal antibody
- Type: Whole antibody
- Source: Humanized (from mouse)
- Target: CD4

Clinical data
- ATC code: none

Identifiers
- CAS Number: 156586-90-2
- ChemSpider: none
- KEGG: D03420

Cedelizumab is a monoclonal antibody acting on the immune system. Possible indications include the prevention of organ transplant rejections and the treatment of autoimmune diseases.
