= Cefmetazole =

Chemical compound

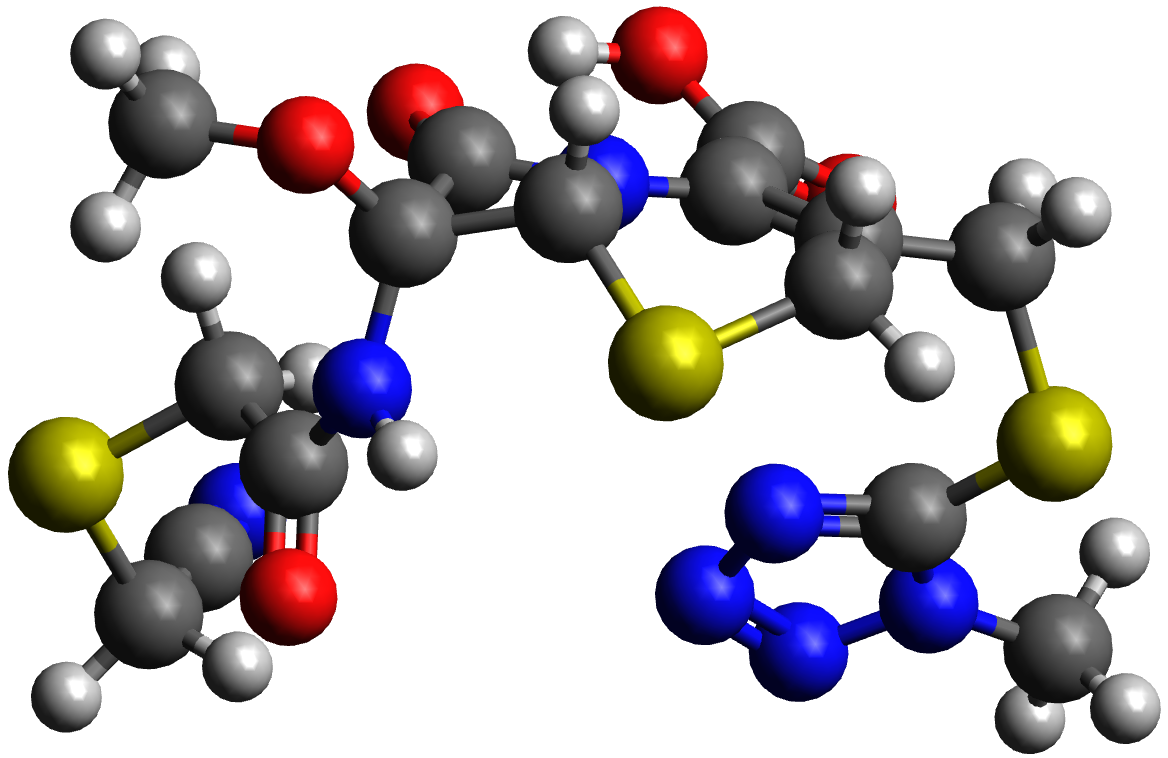

Clinical data
- AHFS/Drugs.com: International Drug Names
- MedlinePlus: a601206
- ATC code: J01DC09 (WHO)

Identifiers
- IUPAC name: (6R,7S)-7-(2-(cyanomethylthio)acetamido)-7-methoxy-3-((1-methyl-1H-tetrazol-5-ylthio)methyl)-8-oxo-5-thia-1-azabicyclo[4.2.0]oct-2-ene-2-carboxylic acid
- CAS Number: 56796-20-4
- PubChem CID: 42008
- DrugBank: DB00274
- ChemSpider: 38311
- UNII: 3J962UJT8H
- KEGG: D00910
- ChEBI: CHEBI:3489
- ChEMBL: ChEMBL1201195
- CompTox Dashboard (EPA): DTXSID7022756
- ECHA InfoCard: 100.054.877

Chemical and physical data
- Formula: C_{15}H_{17}N_{7}O_{5}S_{3}
- Molar mass: 471.53 g·mol^{−1}
- 3D model (JSmol): Interactive image
- SMILES: O=C2N1/C(=C(\CS[C@@H]1[C@]2(OC)NC(=O)CSCC#N)CSc3nnnn3C)C(=O)O
- InChI: InChI=1S/C15H17N7O5S3/c1-21-14(18-19-20-21)30-6-8-5-29-13-15(27-2,17-9(23)7-28-4-3-16)12(26)22(13)10(8)11(24)25/h13H,4-7H2,1-2H3,(H,17,23)(H,24,25)/t13-,15+/m1/s1; Key:SNBUBQHDYVFSQF-HIFRSBDPSA-N

Cefmetazole is a cephamycin antibiotic, usually grouped with the second-generation cephalosporins.

== Adverse effects ==
The chemical structure of cefmetazole, like that of several other cephalosporins, contains an N-methylthiotetrazole (NMTT or 1-MTT) side chain. As the antibiotic is broken down in the body, it releases free NMTT, which can cause hypoprothrombinemia (likely due to inhibition of the enzyme vitamin K epoxide reductase) and a reaction with ethanol similar to that produced by disulfiram, due to inhibition of aldehyde dehydrogenase.

== Spectrum of bacterial susceptibility ==
Cefmetazole is a broad-spectrum cephalosporin antimicrobial and has been effective in treating bacteria responsible for causing urinary tract and skin infections. The following represents MIC susceptibility data for a few medically significant microorganisms.

- Bacteroides fragilis: 0.06 - >256 μg/ml
- Clostridioides difficile: 8 - >128 μg/ml
- Staphylococcus aureus: 0.5 - 256 μg/ml (includes MRSA)
