= Cefamandole =

Chemical compound

Clinical data
- Trade names: former Mandol
- AHFS/Drugs.com: Micromedex Detailed Consumer Information
- MedlinePlus: a601206
- Pregnancy category: AU: B1
- Routes of administration: Intramuscular, intravenous
- ATC code: J01DC03 (WHO)

Legal status
- Legal status: UK: POM (Prescription only); US: Discontinued

Pharmacokinetic data
- Protein binding: 75%
- Elimination half-life: 48 minutes
- Excretion: Mostly renal, as unchanged drug

Identifiers
- IUPAC name: (6R,7R)-7-{[(2R)-2-hydroxy-2-phenylacetyl]amino}- 3-[(1-methyltetrazol-5-yl)sulfanylmethyl]-8-oxo- 5-thia-1-azabicyclo[4.2.0]oct-2-ene-2-carboxylic acid
- CAS Number: 34444-01-4 42540-40-9
- PubChem CID: 456255
- DrugBank: DB01326
- ChemSpider: 401748
- UNII: 5CKP8C2LLI
- KEGG: D02344
- ChEBI: CHEBI:3480
- ChEMBL: ChEMBL1146
- CompTox Dashboard (EPA): DTXSID7022750
- ECHA InfoCard: 100.047.285

Chemical and physical data
- Formula: C_{18}H_{18}N_{6}O_{5}S_{2}
- Molar mass: 462.50 g·mol^{−1}
- 3D model (JSmol): Interactive image
- SMILES: O=C2N1/C(=C(\CS[C@@H]1[C@@H]2NC(=O)[C@H](O)c3ccccc3)CSc4nnnn4C)C(=O)O
- InChI: InChI=1S/C18H18N6O5S2/c1-23-18(20-21-22-23)31-8-10-7-30-16-11(15(27)24(16)12(10)17(28)29)19-14(26)13(25)9-5-3-2-4-6-9/h2-6,11,13,16,25H,7-8H2,1H3,(H,19,26)(H,28,29)/t11-,13-,16-/m1/s1; Key:OLVCFLKTBJRLHI-AXAPSJFSSA-N

Cefamandole (INN, also known as cephamandole) is a second-generation broad-spectrum cephalosporin antibiotic. The clinically used form of cefamandole is the formate ester cefamandole nafate, a prodrug which is administered parenterally. Cefamandole is no longer available in the United States.

The chemical structure of cefamandole, like that of several other cephalosporins, contains an N-methylthiotetrazole (NMTT or 1-MTT) side chain. As the antibiotic is broken down in the body, it releases free NMTT, which can cause hypoprothrombinemia (likely due to inhibition of the enzyme vitamin K epoxide reductase) and a reaction with ethanol similar to that produced by disulfiram (Antabuse), due to inhibition of aldehyde dehydrogenase. Vitamin K supplement is recommended during therapy, and consumption of ethanol and ethanol-containing substances is discouraged.

Cefamandole has a broad spectrum of activity and can be used to treat bacterial infections of the skin, bones and joints, urinary tract, and lower respiratory tract. The following represents cefamandole MIC susceptibility data for a few medically significant microorganisms.

- Escherichia coli: 0.12 - 400 μg/ml
- Haemophilus influenzae: 0.06 - >16 μg/ml
- Staphylococcus aureus: 0.1 - 12.5 μg/ml

CO_{2} is generated during the normal constitution of cefamandole and ceftazidime, potentially resulting in an explosive-like reaction in syringes.

== See also ==
- Cefazolin
- Ceforanide
