= Cefroxadine =

Chemical compound

Clinical data
- AHFS/Drugs.com: International Drug Names
- Routes of administration: Oral
- ATC code: J01DB11 (WHO)

Legal status
- Legal status: In general: ℞ (Prescription only)

Pharmacokinetic data
- Elimination half-life: ~1 hour
- Excretion: Renal

Identifiers
- IUPAC name: (6R,7R)-7-{[(2R)-2-amino-2-cyclohexa-1,4-dien-1-ylacetyl]amino}-3-methoxy-8-oxo-5-thia-1-azabicyclo[4.2.0]octane-2-carboxylic acid
- CAS Number: 51762-05-1
- PubChem CID: 443991
- ChemSpider: 4447587
- UNII: B908C4MV2R
- KEGG: D01528
- ChEMBL: ChEMBL2104150
- CompTox Dashboard (EPA): DTXSID1022768
- ECHA InfoCard: 100.052.157

Chemical and physical data
- Formula: C_{16}H_{19}N_{3}O_{5}S
- Molar mass: 365.40 g·mol^{−1}
- 3D model (JSmol): Interactive image
- SMILES: O=C2N1/C(=C(/OC)CS[C@@H]1[C@@H]2NC(=O)[C@@H](C/3=C/C\C=C/C\3)N)C(=O)O

Cefroxadine (INN, trade names Oraspor and Cefthan-DS) is a cephalosporin antibiotic. It is structurally related to cefalexin, and both drugs share a similar spectrum of activity.

It is available in Italy.

== Synthesis ==
Cefroxadine can be prepared by several routes, including one in which the enol is methylated with diazomethane as a key step. A rather more involved route starts with comparatively readily available phenoxymethylpenicillin sulfoxide benzhydryl ester (1).

Synthesis of cefroxadine

This undergoes fragmentation when treated with benzothiazole-2-thiol to give 2. Ozonolysis (reductive work-up) cleaves the olefinic linkage and the unsymmetrical disulfide moiety is converted to a tosyl thioester (3). The enol moiety is methylated with diazomethane, the six-membered ring is closed by reaction with 1,5-diazabicyclo[5.4.0]undec-5-ene (DBU), and the ester protection is removed with trifluoroacetic acid to give 4. The amide side chain is removed by the usual PCl_{5}/dimethylaniline sequence followed by reamidation with the appropriate acid chloride to give cefroxadine (5).

== See also ==
- Cefachlor
