= Cefaloglycin =

Chemical compound

Clinical data
- Trade names: Kafocin
- License data: US FDA: Withdrawn
- ATC code: none

Identifiers
- IUPAC name: (6R,7R)-3-[(acetyloxy)methyl]-7-{[(2R)-2-amino-2-phenylacetyl]amino}-8-oxo-5-thia-1-azabicyclo[4.2.0]oct-2-ene-2-carboxylic acid
- CAS Number: 3577-01-3
- PubChem CID: 19150
- DrugBank: DB00689
- ChemSpider: 18069
- UNII: HD2D469W6U
- KEGG: D01949
- ChEBI: CHEBI:34613
- ChEMBL: ChEMBL1200971
- CompTox Dashboard (EPA): DTXSID4022781
- ECHA InfoCard: 100.020.633

Chemical and physical data
- Formula: C_{18}H_{19}N_{3}O_{6}S
- Molar mass: 405.43 g·mol^{−1}
- 3D model (JSmol): Interactive image
- SMILES: O=C2N1/C(=C(\CS[C@@H]1[C@@H]2NC(=O)[C@@H](c3ccccc3)N)COC(=O)C)C(=O)O
- InChI: InChI=1S/C18H19N3O6S/c1-9(22)27-7-11-8-28-17-13(16(24)21(17)14(11)18(25)26)20-15(23)12(19)10-5-3-2-4-6-10/h2-6,12-13,17H,7-8,19H2,1H3,(H,20,23)(H,25,26)/t12-,13-,17-/m1/s1; Key:FUBBGQLTSCSAON-PBFPGSCMSA-N

Cefaloglycin INN (also spelled cephaloglycin) was the first cephalosporin antibiotic to be suitable for oral administration. It was sold in the United States by Eli Lilly and Company as Kafocin. It was discontinued by its manufacturer, and as of 2026, no generic versions have been approved.
