= 7-ACA =

7-Aminocephalosporanic acid
- Partially condensed, stereo, skeletal formula of 7-aminocephalosporanic acid

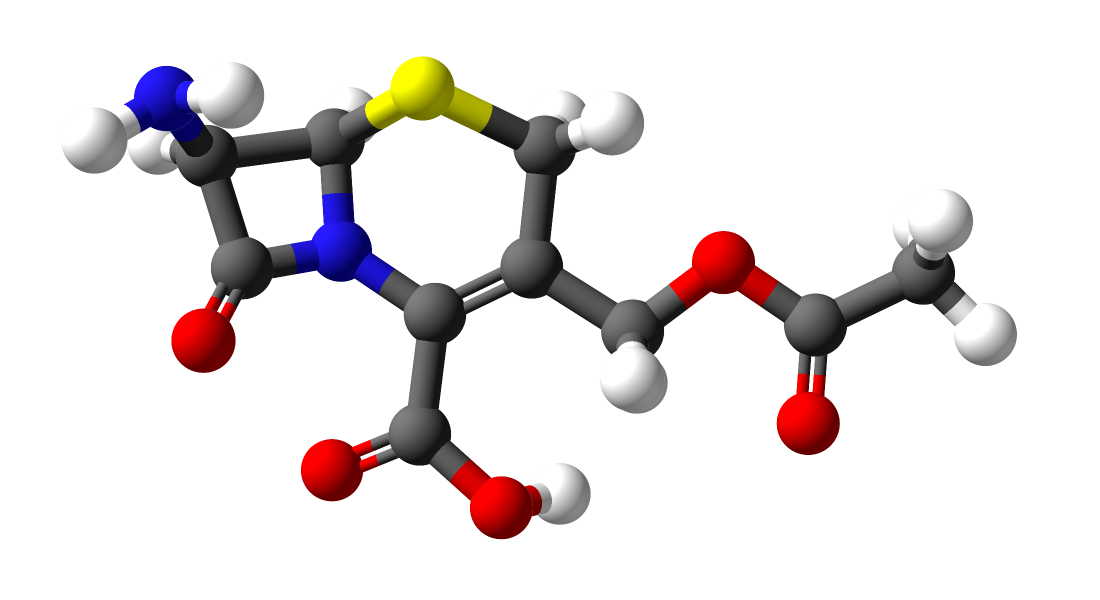

Names
- IUPAC name 3-[(Acetyloxy)methyl]-7β-amino-3,4-didehydrocepham-4-carboxylic acid
- Systematic IUPAC name (6R,7R)-3-[(Acetyloxy)methyl]-7-amino-8-oxo-5-thia-1-azabicyclo[4.2.0]oct-2-ene-2-carboxylic acid
- Other names 7-Aminocephalosporinic acid

Identifiers
| CAS Number | 957-68-6 |
| 3D model (JSmol) | Interactive image |
| Abbreviations | 7-ACA |
| Beilstein Reference | 622637, 8919572 |
| ChEBI | CHEBI:2255 |
| ChEMBL | ChEMBL1161449 |
| ChemSpider | 390087 |
| ECHA InfoCard | 100.012.259 |
| EC Number | 213-485-0 |
| KEGG | C07756 |
| MeSH | 7-Aminocephalosporanic+acid |
| PubChem CID | 483168 |
| UNII | 9XI67897RG |
| CompTox Dashboard (EPA) | DTXSID9045342 |
- InChI: InChI=1S/C10H12N2O5S/c1-4(13)17-2-5-3-18-9-6(11)8(14)12(9)7(5)10(15)16/h6,9H,2-3,11H2,1H3,(H,15,16)/t6-,9-/m1/s1 Key: HSHGZXNAXBPPDL-HZGVNTEJSA-N
- SMILES: O=C2N1/C(=C(\CS[C@@H]1[C@@H]2N)COC(=O)C)C(=O)O

Properties
| Chemical formula | C_{10}H_{12}N_{2}O_{5}S |
| Molar mass | 272.27 g·mol^{−1} |
| Melting point | 300 °C (572 °F; 573 K) |
| log P | −1.87 |
| Acidity (pK_{a}) | 2.59 |
| Basicity (pK_{b}) | 11.41 |

Hazards
- GHS labelling
| Pictograms | (GHS08: Health hazard) |
| Signal word | Danger |
| Hazard statements | H317, H334 |
| Precautionary statements | P261, P280, P342+P311 |
- Except where otherwise noted, data are given for materials in their standard state (at 25 °C [77 °F], 100 kPa). verify (what is ?) Infobox references

7-ACA (7-aminocephalosporanic acid) is the core chemical structure (a synthon) for the synthesis of cephalosporin antibiotics and intermediates. It can be obtained by chemoenzymatic hydrolysis of cephalosporin C.

The production of 7-ACA (7-aminocephalosporanic acid) is predominantly segmented into two methods which is Enzymatic Hydrolysis and Chemical Cracking. These processes are essential for the synthesis of various cephalosporin antibiotics.

== See also ==
- 6-APA
