= Cefacetrile =

Chemical compound

Clinical data
- Trade names: Celospor, Celtol, Cristacef
- AHFS/Drugs.com: International Drug Names
- Routes of administration: Intravenous, intramuscular, intramammary
- ATC code: J01DB10 (WHO) QJ51DB10 (WHO)

Legal status
- Legal status: In general: ℞ (Prescription only)

Pharmacokinetic data
- Protein binding: 23 to 38%
- Elimination half-life: 1.2 hours
- Excretion: Renal (72%)

Identifiers
- IUPAC name: (6R,7R)-3-(acetyloxymethyl)-7-[(2-cyanoacetyl)amino]- 8-oxo-5-thia-1-azabicyclo[4.2.0]oct-2-ene-2- carboxylic acid
- CAS Number: 10206-21-0
- PubChem CID: 91562
- DrugBank: DB01414
- ChemSpider: 82675
- UNII: FDM21QQ344
- KEGG: D07629
- ChEMBL: ChEMBL2104099
- CompTox Dashboard (EPA): DTXSID0022779
- ECHA InfoCard: 100.030.449

Chemical and physical data
- Formula: C_{13}H_{13}N_{3}O_{6}S
- Molar mass: 339.32 g·mol^{−1}
- 3D model (JSmol): Interactive image
- SMILES: O=C2N1/C(=C(\CS[C@@H]1[C@@H]2NC(=O)CC#N)COC(=O)C)C(=O)O
- InChI: InChI=1S/C13H13N3O6S/c1-6(17)22-4-7-5-23-12-9(15-8(18)2-3-14)11(19)16(12)10(7)13(20)21/h9,12H,2,4-5H2,1H3,(H,15,18)(H,20,21)/t9-,12-/m1/s1; Key:RRYMAQUWDLIUPV-BXKDBHETSA-N

Cefacetrile (INN, also spelled cephacetrile) is a broad-spectrum first generation cephalosporin antibiotic effective in gram-positive and gram-negative bacterial infections. It is a bacteriostatic antibiotic. Cefacetrile is marketed under the trade names Celospor, Celtol, and Cristacef, and as Vetimast for the treatment of mammary infections in lactating cows.

== Synthesis ==
Cefacetrile synthesis: NL 6600586 (1966 to Ciba-Geigy).

It was made by reacting 7-ACA (7-aminocephalosporanic acid) with cyanoacetyl chloride in the presence of tributylamine.
