= Cephem =

Class of beta-lactam antibiotic

Core structure of the cephalosporins.

Core structure of the cephamycins.

Cephems are a sub-group of β-lactam antibiotics including cephalosporins and cephamycins. It is one of the more common 4-membered ring Heterocyclic compounds in the clinic. Produced by actinomycetes, cephamycins were found to display antibacterial activity against a wide range of bacteria, including those resistant to penicillin and cephalosporins. The antimicrobial properties of cephem include the attachment to certain penicillin-binding proteins that are involved in the production of cell walls of bacteria.
