= Hypoprothrombinemia =

- Other names: Congenital factor II deficiency
- This condition is inherited in an autosomal recessive manner.
- Specialty: Hematology

Hypoprothrombinemia is a rare blood disorder in which a deficiency in immunoreactive prothrombin (Factor II), produced in the liver, results in an impaired blood clotting reaction, leading to an increased physiological risk for spontaneous bleeding. This condition can be observed in the gastrointestinal system, cranial vault, and superficial integumentary system, affecting both the male and female population. Prothrombin is a critical protein that is involved in the process of hemostasis, as well as illustrating procoagulant activities. This condition is characterized as an autosomal recessive inheritance congenital coagulation disorder affecting 1 per 2,000,000 of the population, worldwide, but is also attributed as acquired.

== Signs and symptoms ==
There are various symptoms that are presented and are typically associated to a specific site that they appear at. Hypoprothrombinemia is characterized by a poor blood clotting function of prothrombin. Some symptoms are presented as severe, while others are mild, meaning that blood clotting is slower than normal. Areas that are usually affected are muscles, joints, and the brain, however, these sites are more uncommon.

The most common symptoms include:

1. Easy bruising
2. Oral mucosal bleeding - Bleeding of the membrane mucus lining inside of the mouth.
3. Soft tissue bleeding.
4. Hemarthrosis - Bleeding in joint spaces.
5. Epistaxis - Acute hemorrhages from areas of the nasal cavity, nostrils, or nasopharynx.
6. Women with this deficiency experience menorrhagia: prolonged, abnormal heavy menstrual bleeding. This is typically a symptom of the disorder when severe blood loss occurs.

Other reported symptoms that are related to the condition:

1. Prolonged periods of bleeding due to surgery, injury, or post birth.
2. Melena - Associated with acute gastrointestinal bleeding, dark black, tarry feces.
3. Hematochezia - Lower gastrointestinal bleeding, passage of fresh, bright red blood through the anus secreted in or with stools. If associated with upper gastrointestinal bleeding, suggestive of a more life-threatening issue.

Type I: Severe hemorrhages are indicators of a more severe prothrombin deficiency that account for muscle hematomas, intracranial bleeding, postoperative bleeding, and umbilical cord hemorrhage, which may also occur depending on the severity, respectively.

Type II: Symptoms are usually more capricious, but can include a variety of the symptoms described previously. Less severe cases of the disorder typically do not involve spontaneous bleeding.

== Causes ==
Hypoprothrombinemia can be the result of a genetic defect, may be acquired as the result of another disease process, or may be an adverse effect of medication. For example, 5-10% of patients with systemic lupus erythematosus exhibit acquired hypoprothrombinemia due to the presence of autoantibodies which bind to prothrombin and remove it from the bloodstream (lupus anticoagulant-hypoprothrombinemia syndrome). The most common viral pathogen that is involved is Adenovirus, with a prevalence of 50% in postviral cases.

=== Inheritance ===
Autosomal recessive condition in which both parents must carry the recessive gene in order to pass the disease on to offspring. If both parents have the autosomal recessive condition, the chance of mutation in offspring increases to 100%. An individual will be considered a carrier if one mutant copy of the gene is inherited, and will not illustrate any symptoms. The disease affects both men and women equally, and overall, is a very uncommon inherited or acquired disorder.

=== Non-inheritance and other factors ===
There are two types of prothrombin deficiencies that occur depending on the mutation:

Type I (true deficiency), includes a missense or nonsense mutation, essentially decreasing prothrombin production. This is associated with bleeding from birth. Here, plasma levels of prothrombin are typically less than 10% of normal levels.

Type II, known as dysprothrombinemia, includes a missense mutation at specific Xa factor cleavage sites and serine protease prothrombin regions. Type II deficiency creates a dysfunctional protein with decreased activity and usually normal or low-normal antigen levels. A vitamin K-dependent clotting factor is seldom seen as a contributor to inherited prothrombin deficiencies, but lack of Vitamin K decreases the synthesis of prothrombin in liver cells.

Acquired underlying causes of this condition include severe liver disease, warfarin overdose, platelet disorders, and disseminated intravascular coagulation (DIC).

It may also be a rare adverse effect to ceftriaxone.

== Mechanism ==
Hypoprothrombinemia is found to present itself as either inherited or acquired, and is a decrease in the synthesis of prothrombin. In the process of inheritance, it marks itself as an autosomal recessive disorder, meaning that both parents must be carriers of the defective gene in order for the disorder to be present in a child. Prothrombin is a glycoprotein that occurs in blood plasma and functions as a precursor to the enzyme, thrombin, which acts to convert fibrinogen into fibrin, therefore, fortifying clots. This clotting process is known as coagulation.

The mechanism specific to prothrombin (factor II) includes the proteolytically cleaving, breakdown of proteins into smaller polypeptides or amino acids, of this coagulation factor in order to form thrombin at the beginning of the cascade, leading to stemming of blood loss. A mutation in factor II would essentially lead to hypoprothrombinemia. The mutation is presented on chromosome 11.

Areas where the disease has been shown to present itself at include the liver, since the glycoprotein is stored in this area.

Acquired cases are results from an isolated factor II deficiency. Specific cases include:

1. Vitamin K deficiency: In the liver, vitamin K plays an important role in the synthesis of coagulation factor II. Body's capacity in the storage of vitamin K is typically very low. Vitamin K-dependent coagulation factors have a very short half-life, sometimes leading to a deficiency when a depletion of vitamin K occurs. The liver synthesizes inactive precursor proteins in the absence of vitamin K (liver disease). Vitamin K deficiency leads to impaired clotting of the blood and in some cases, causes internal bleeding without an associated injury.
2. Disseminated intravascular coagulation (DIC): Involving abnormal, excessive generation of thrombin and fibrin within the blood. Relative to hypoprothrombinemia, due to increased platelet aggregation and coagulation factor consumption involved in the process.
3. Anticoagulants: warfarin overdose: Used as a treatment for prevention of blood clots, however, like most drugs, side effects have been shown to increase risk of excessive bleeding by functioning in the disruption of hepatic synthesis of coagulation factors II, VII, IX, and X. Vitamin K is an antagonist to warfarin drug, reversing its activity, causing it to be less effective in the process of blood clotting. Warfarin intake has been shown to interfere with Vitamin-K metabolism.

== Diagnosis ==
Diagnosis of inherited hypoprothrombinemia, relies heavily on a patient's medical history, family history of bleeding issues, and lab exams performed by a hematologist. A physical examination by a general physician should also be performed in order to determine whether the condition is congenital or acquired, as well as ruling out other possible conditions with similar symptoms. For acquired forms, information must be taken regarding current diseases and medications taken by the patient, if applicable.

Lab tests that are performed to determine diagnosis:

1. Factor assays: To observe the performance of specific factors (II) to identify missing/poorly performing factors. These lab tests are typically performed first in order to determine the status of the factor.
2. Prothrombin blood test: Determines if a patient has deficient or low levels of Factor II.
3. Vitamin K1 test: Performed to evaluate bleeding of unknown causes, nosebleeds, and identified bruising. To accomplish this, a band is wrapped around the patient's arm, 4 inches above the superficial vein site in the elbow pit. The vein is penetrated with the needle and amount of blood required for testing is obtained. Decreased vitamin K levels are suggestive of hypoprothrombinemia. However, this exam is rarely used as a prothrombin blood test is performed beforehand.

== Treatment ==
Treatment is almost always aimed to control hemorrhages, treating underlying causes, and taking preventative steps before performing invasive surgeries.

Hypoprothrombinemia can be treated with periodic infusions of purified prothrombin complexes. These are typically used as treatment methods for severe bleeding cases in order to boost clotting ability and increasing levels of vitamin K-dependent coagulation factors.

1. A known treatment for hypoprothrombinemia is menadoxime.
2. Menatetrenone was also listed as an antihemorrhagic vitamin.
3. 4-Amino-2-methyl-1-naphthol (Vitamin K5) is another treatment for hypoprothrombinemia.
  1. Vitamin K forms are administered orally or intravenously.
4. Other concentrates include Proplex T, Konyne 80, and Bebulin VH.

Fresh frozen plasma infusion (FFP) is a method used for continuous bleeding episodes, every 3–5 weeks for mention.

1. Used to treat various conditions related to low blood clotting factors.
2. Administered by intravenous injection and typically at a 15-20 ml/kg/dose.
3. Can be used to treat acute bleeding.

Invasive options, such as surgery or clotting factor infusions, are required if previous methods do not suffice. Surgery is to be avoided, as it causes significant bleeding in patients with hypoprothrombinemia.

== Prognosis ==
Prognosis for patients varies and is dependent on severity of the condition and how early the treatment is managed.

1. With proper treatment and care, most people go on to live a normal and healthy life.
2. With more severe cases, a hematologist will need to be seen throughout the patient's life in order to deal with bleeding and continued risks.
