= Gillon (surname) =

Gillon is a surname. Notable people with this name include:

- Alex Gillon (1909–2007), Australian civic and sporting administrator
- Alexander Gillon (1741–1794), American merchant and seaman
- Ashleigh Gillon, Australian journalist
- Carmi Gillon (born 1950), Israeli politician
- Cydney Gillon, American bodybuilder
- Edward Thomas Gillon (1842–1896), New Zealand journalist
- Ern Gillon, Australian rugby player
- Gail Gillon, New Zealand child development academic
- George Gillon (born 1942), British politician
- Grant Gillon, New Zealand politician
- Karen Gillon (born 1967), Scottish politician
- John Gillon (born 1994), American basketball player
- John Gillon, fictional character in 1992 sports comedy-drama film Diggstown
- Mary Gillon (1898–2002), Scottish woman conductress during WWI
- Paul Gillon (1926–2011), French comics artist
- Peter Gillon (1939–2018), Australian rower
- Raanan Gillon, British professor of medical ethics
- Robert Gillon (1884–1972), Belgian lawyer and politician
- Steven M. Gillon, American historian
- William Downe Gillon (1801–1846), Scottish politician

== See also ==
- Gillón, Spanish municipality
- River Gillon, in the Dominican Republic
