= San Pedru Culiema =

- Parish
- Location within Spain
- Coordinates: 43.235753°N 6.476819°W
- Country: Spain
- Autonomous community: Asturias
- Province: Asturias
- Municipality: Cangas del Narcea

San Pedru Culiema is one of 54 parish councils in Cangas del Narcea, a municipality within the province and autonomous community of Asturias, in northern Spain.

Its villages include: Barnéu, San Pedru Culiema, Fontaniel.la, Soutu los Molinos, Vecil, Viḷḷadestre, and Viḷḷouril de Sierra.
