= Noceda =

Noceda may refer to:

== Geography ==
- Noceda (river), a river in Province of León, in Castile and León, Spain
- Noceda del Bierzo, a village and municipality in the region of El Bierzo, in Province of León, Castile and León, Spain
- Noceda de Rengos, one of 54 parish councils in Cangas del Narcea, a municipality in Asturias, Spain

== People ==
People with the surname Noceda include:

- Lunna (born 1960; María Socorro García de la Noceda), is a singer of popular music and jazz who was the director of the television
- Jorge Noceda Sánchez (1925–1987), diplomat and painter from the Dominican Republic
- Rubén Noceda (1931–2007), football goalkeeper from Paraguay

=== Fictional characters ===
- Luz Noceda, protagonist of the 2020 American animated series The Owl House

== See also ==
- Noseda, people with a similar surname
