= La Regla =

La Regla (Spanish for "The Rule") may refer to:

- La Regla de Perandones, a parish in Cangas del Narcea, Asturias, Spain
- Palo (religion), also known as La Regla de Congo, an African diaspora religion
- Santería, also known as La Regla de Ocha or La Regla Lucumí, an African diaspora religion

== See also ==
- Regla (disambiguation)
