= Regla (disambiguation) =

Regla is a municipality of Havana, Cuba.

Regla (Spanish for "Rule") may also refer to:

== People ==
- Regla Bell (born 1970), Cuban volleyball player
- Regla Cárdenas (born 1975), Cuban heptathlete
- Regla Gracia (born 1993), Cuban volleyball player
- Regla Hernández (born 1968), Cuban basketball player
- Regla Leyén (born 1979), Cuban judoka
- Regla Torres (born 1975), Cuban volleyball player

== Religions ==
- Palo (religion), also known as Regla de Congo, an African diaspora religion
- Santería, also known as Regla de Ocha or Regla Lucumí, an African diaspora religion

== Other uses ==
- La Regla de Perandones, a parish in Cangas del Narcea, Spain
- Salvia regla, a species of flowering plant

== See also ==
- La Regla (disambiguation)
