= Larna =

- Parish
- Location within Spain
- Coordinates: 43.083333°N 6.616667°W
- Country: Spain
- Autonomous community: Asturias
- Province: Asturias
- Municipality: Cangas del Narcea

Larna is one of the 54 parish councils in Cangas del Narcea, a municipality within the province and autonomous community of Asturias, in northern Spain. It is located near the core area of the Muniellos Biosphere Reserve.

The population was 78 in 2007.

== Villages ==
- Larna
- Pandiel.lu
- La Pescal
- Sasturrasu
- Soutiel.lu

=== Other settlements ===
- Casa'i L.lui
- Navéu
- La Ponte
