= Mycoplasmopsis bovis =

Scientific classification
- Domain: Bacteria
- Kingdom: Bacillati
- Phylum: Mycoplasmatota
- Class: Mollicutes
- Order: Mycoplasmatales
- Family: Mycoplasmataceae
- Genus: Mycoplasma
- Species: M. bovis

Binomial name
- Mycoplasma bovis (Hale et al. 1962) Askaa and Ernø 1976 (Approved Lists 1980)

Species of bacterium

Mycoplasma bovis (M.bovis) is one of 126 species of genus Mycoplasma. It is the smallest living cell and anaerobic organism in nature. It does not contain any cell wall and is therefore resistant to penicillin and other beta lactam antibiotics.On solid media, M. bovis forms typical "fried-egg" colonies, characterized by neatly defined edges, a smooth surface, and a darker central umbilicus.

Mycoplasma bovis mainly affects cattle and has little effect on other production animals. It does not affect horses and or pet animals, but other animals can be carriers for Mycoplasma bovis. Circa 2020, Wyoming Game and Fish reported that the pronghorn is now affected by the disease, with very high mortality. Mycoplasma bovis causes a constellation of diseases, including mastitis in dairy cows, arthritis in cows and calves, pneumonia in calves, otitis media and various other diseases likely including late-term abortion. Not all infected cows get sick – some shed the disease without becoming ill, allowing for transmission between farms if apparently healthy cows are moved.

== Signs and symptoms ==
=== Mastitis ===
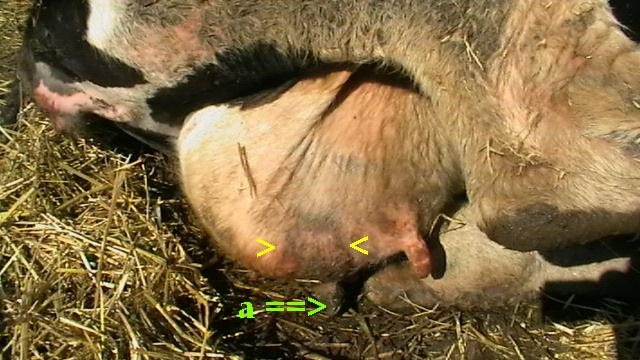
Gangrenous mastitis in a cow, Day 10; green arrow: complete necrosis of the teat; yellow arrows: limits of the gangrenous tissue, but the necrotic area is not well delimited on the upper part of the udder

Mastitis can occur in dairy cows of any age. The most common clinical symptoms include udder swelling and abnormal appearance of the milk, with reports ranging from watery and flaky milk to thick purulent inflammatory fluid. Mastitis can cause a decline in potassium and lactoferrin. It also results in decreased casein, the major protein in milk. As most calcium in milk is associated with casein, the disruption of casein synthesis contributes to lowered calcium in milk. The milk protein continues to undergo further deterioration during processing and storage. Milk from cows with mastitis also has a higher somatic cell count. Generally speaking, the higher the somatic cell count, the lower the milk quality.

=== Bovine respiratory disease ===
In early bovine respiratory disease (BRD) cases, the lungs and airways are generally painful, so the animal will try to clear the airway with mild, tentative, soft coughing. Fever of over 40 °C (104 °F) is one of the earliest signs of BRD.Mycoplasma bovis often co-occurs with other bacterial or viral pathogens, and in such mixed infections, its clinical signs are difficult to differentiate from those of other respiratory diseases.

- Depression
- Lack of appetite
- Dullness
- Respiratory signs:
  - Rapid, shallow breathing
  - Coughing

=== Arthritis ===
Cattle effected by arthritis have difficulty in moving, including getting up and swelling in joints. Some outbreaks have many lame calves while others have no effected calves. Some calves have swollen joints that are so painful that they will be reluctant to walk to the feed and water bunks. In rare cases calves can have spinal issues, tiredness, irritability, muscle atrophy, licking, chewing and biting.

== Prevention ==
There are many ways by which cattle can be prevented from catching Mycoplasma bovis and other pathogenic bacteria.

=== Transport of animals ===
Animal transport vehicles should be cleaned with disinfectants before and after use. Environmental swabs should be taken and samples sent to a microbiology lab. If any harmful bacteria are detected, further action should be taken.

=== Visitors ===
Only authorized people should be allowed to visit a farm. Visitors should arrive with clean clothing and footwear. Disinfectant on arrival and departure can reduce the spread of bacteria. For example, a water mat with disinfectant can be used in the entrance of the farm.

=== Weekly inspection and maintenance ===
Weekly cleaning of all the areas and equipment reduces the chances of animals getting sick. Also, it is important to clean the feedlot container and keep the feed dry. Doubling the boundary fence with a 6-inch gap prevents the animals contacting neighbouring animals.

=== Vaccination ===
Several vaccines are available: Pulmo-GuardMpB, Mycomune Mycoplasma Bovis bacterin, Myco-BacTM B and Protivity

China approved a live intranasal vaccine based on strain HB150 (attenuated from HB0801) in February 2025, followed by an inactivated injected vaccine based on strain HM in March 2025.

== Diagnostics ==
Mycoplasma bovis can be analyzed with culture, PCR (polymerase chain reaction) or serology. The growth of Mycoplasma bovis is slow, and it is easily overgrown by other bacteria or pathogens, making the isolation and purification process challenging. Therefore, PCR is most commonly used and also serology. A collaboration between six different European laboratories (CoVetLab) showed that the different in-house PCR that were used worked well A European interlaboratory trial to evaluate the performance of different PCR methods for Mycoplasma bovis diagnosis

The CoVetLab project also evaluated three different serological methods and found that two of them were performing well A European inter-laboratory trial to evaluate the performance of three serological methods for diagnosis of Mycoplasma bovis infection in cattle using latent class analysis

== History and taxonomy ==
Mycoplasma bovis was first isolated in the United States from the milk of a mastitic cow in 1961. It was initially described as Mycoplasma agalactia var bovis by Hale and colleagues, on the basis of biochemical reactions and its association with bovine mastitis. Later work, based on serological responses and DNA homology studies confirmed that the new Mycoplasma was a different species and renamed it Mycoplasma bovis

As of June 2017, only two OECD nations (New Zealand and Norway) were considered to be free of Mycoplasma bovis, but in July 2017 some cattle near Oamaru, New Zealand were found to be Mycoplasma bovis positive; see 2017 Mycoplasma bovis outbreak.

=== China ===
The first isolation of M. bovis (strain HB0801) in China was from beef cattle with pneumonia. It shows morbidity rates of 50–100% and mortality rates of 10–50% among affected herds.

== Loss to economy ==
There are only estimated economic losses in two continents due to Mycoplasma bovis. The estimated loss in Europe due to Mycoplasma bovis is approximately €576 million per year. The total loss in the United States is estimated to be $108 million. US losses due to mastitis, lack of the weight gain and diminished carcass value are valued at $32 million. It is very expensive for the government and the farmers to control Mycoplasma bovis. Also, it affects the production of milk and the cost for treatment is high. Because cows are the main source of income to most of the farmers, many governments have to reimburse the farmers for loss of income and stock value, which affects the economy.

== Treatment ==
Mycoplasma species have unusual characteristics for bacteria. Unlike other bacteria, they can live in cultures outside cells and they lack a cell wall. Some antibiotics, such as the β-lactam and glycopeptide classes of antibiotics, exert their effects by damaging cell walls, and thus are ineffective against Mycoplasma species. However, they can be killed by antibiotics such as tetracyclines, macrolides or erythromycin which do not act on the cell wall. Draxxin (Tulathromycin) and Resflor Gold are the only drugs approved for treating Mycoplasma bovis in cattle, but Florfenicol (Nuflor) and Batril can also be used. The normal duration of the treatment is 10–14 days by antibiotic therapy.
