= ZTS =

ZTS may refer to:

- Zoetis (NYSE symbol ZTS), an American drug company
- Tahsis Water Aerodrome (IATA code ZTS), in British Columbia, Canada
- Zero trust security
- Zero to sixty, a vehicular acceleration measurement
