= Ambres (disambiguation) =

Ambres may refer to:

- Ambres, a commune of the Tarn department in southern France
- Ambres (Narcea), a parish in Cangas del Narcea, Spain
- Chip Ambres (born 1979), American Major League Baseball player
- Mildon Ambres (born 1984), American basketball player
