= Tulathromycin =

Cattle and pig antibiotic

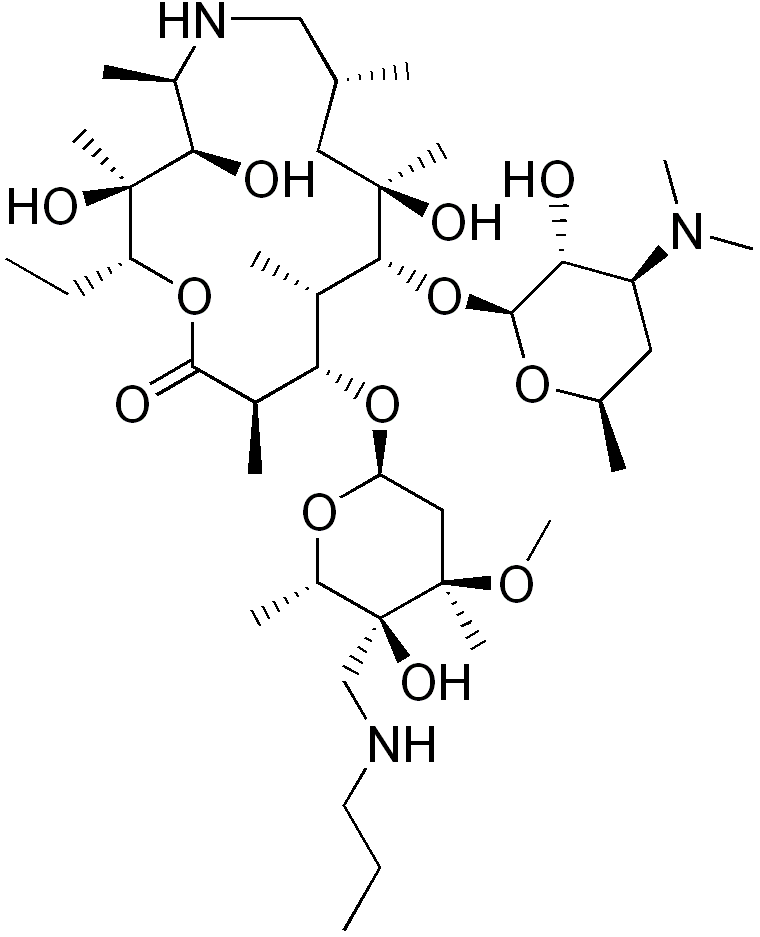

Clinical data
- Trade names: Draxxin, others
- AHFS/Drugs.com: International Drug Names
- Routes of administration: Intramuscular, subcutaneous
- ATCvet code: QJ01FA94 (WHO)

Legal status
- Legal status: CA: ℞-only; US: ℞-only; EU: Rx-only

Identifiers
- IUPAC name: (2R,3S,4R,5R,8R,10R,11R,12S,13S,14R)-13-({2,6-dideoxy-3-C-methyl-3-Ο-methyl-4-C-[(propylamino)methyl]-α-L-ribo-hexopyranosyl}oxy)-2-ethyl-3,4,10-trihydroxy-3,5,8,10,12,14-hexamethyl-11-{[3,4,6-trideoxy-3-(dimethylamino)-β-D-xylo-hexopyranosyl]oxy}-1-oxa-6-azacyclopentadecan-15-one
- CAS Number: 217500-96-4
- DrugBank: DB11474
- ChemSpider: 24583287
- UNII: Q839I13422; 897A3KN7AP
- KEGG: D06258; C21788
- CompTox Dashboard (EPA): DTXSID60274184
- ECHA InfoCard: 100.166.454

Chemical and physical data
- Formula: C_{41}H_{79}N_{3}O_{12}
- Molar mass: 806.092 g·mol^{−1}
- 3D model (JSmol): Interactive image
- SMILES: CCCNCC1(C(OC(CC1(C)OC)OC2C(C(C(CC(NC(C(C(C(OC(=O)C2C)CC)(C)O)O)C)C)(C)O)OC3C(C(CC(O3)C)N(C)C)O)C)C)O
- InChI: InChI=1S/C40H77N3O12/c1-15-17-41-21-40(49)27(8)52-30(20-38(40,10)50-14)54-32-24(5)34(55-36-31(44)28(43(12)13)18-23(4)51-36)37(9,47)19-22(3)42-26(7)33(45)39(11,48)29(16-2)53-35(46)25(32)6/h22-34,36,41-42,44-45,47-49H,15-21H2,1-14H3/t22-,23-,24+,25-,26-,27+,28+,29-,30+,31-,32+,33-,34-,36+,37-,38-,39-,40+/m1/s1; Key:HWATWVYEWMIMSO-FROLMUNOSA-N; InChI=1S/C41H79N3O12/c1-15-17-42-22-41(50)28(8)53-31(20-39(41,10)51-14)55-33-25(5)35(56-37-32(45)29(44(12)13)18-24(4)52-37)38(9,48)19-23(3)21-43-27(7)34(46)40(11,49)30(16-2)54-36(47)26(33)6/h23-35,37,42-43,45-46,48-50H,15-22H2,1-14H3/t23-,24-,25+,26-,27-,28+,29+,30-,31+,32-,33+,34-,35-,37+,38-,39-,40-,41+/m1/s1; Key:GUARTUJKFNAVIK-QPTWMBCESA-N

Tulathromycin, sold under the brand name Draxxin among others, is a macrolide antibiotic used to treat bovine respiratory disease in cattle and swine respiratory disease in pigs.

== Medical uses ==
Tulathromycin is indicated for:

Cattle: Treatment and metaphylaxis of bovine respiratory disease (BRD) associated with Mannheimia haemolytica, Pasteurella multocida, Histophilus somni, and Mycoplasma bovis sensitive to tulathromycin.

Treatment of infectious bovine keratoconjunctivitis (IBK) associated with Moraxella bovis sensitive to tulathromycin.

Pigs: Treatment and metaphylaxis of swine respiratory disease (SRD) associated with Actinobacillus pleuropneumoniae, Pasteurella multocida, Mycoplasma hyopneumoniae, Haemophilus parasuis, and Bordetella bronchiseptica sensitive to tulathromycin.

Sheep: Treatment of the early stages of infectious pododermatitis (foot rot) associated with virulent Dichelobacter nodosus requiring systemic treatment.

== Society and culture ==
=== Legal status ===
Tulathromycin (brand name Draxxin) was approved for medical use in the European Union in November 2003.

Tulathromycin (brand names Tulissin and Tulaven) was approved for medical use in the European Union in April 2020.

In July 2020, the Committee for Medicinal Products for Veterinary Use (CVMP) adopted positive opinions, recommending the granting of marketing authorizations for the veterinary medicinal products Increxxa and Tulinovet solutions for injection for cattle, pigs and sheep. The applicant for Increxxa is Elanco GmbH. The applicant for Tulinovet is VMD N.V. Increxxa was approved for veterinary use in the European Union in September 2020.

=== Brand names ===
It is marketed by Zoetis under the brand name Draxxin.

It is marketed by Bimeda Inc. under the brand name Macrosyn, and by Merck & Co. under the brand name Arovyn.

It is also sold under the brand name Increxxa. by Elanco
