= Entreviñas =

Entreviñas may refer to:

- Entreviñas (Avilés)
- Entreviñas (Narcea)
