= Oubachu =

- Parish
- Location within Spain
- Coordinates: 43.066667°N 6.65°W
- Country: Spain
- Autonomous community: Asturias
- Province: Asturias
- Municipality: Cangas del Narcea

Oubachu is one of 54 parish councils in Cangas del Narcea, a municipality within the province and autonomous community of Asturias, in northern Spain.

== Villages ==
- Oubachu
- Tablizas
- La Veiga'l Tachu
