= Monesteriu d'Ermu =

- Parish
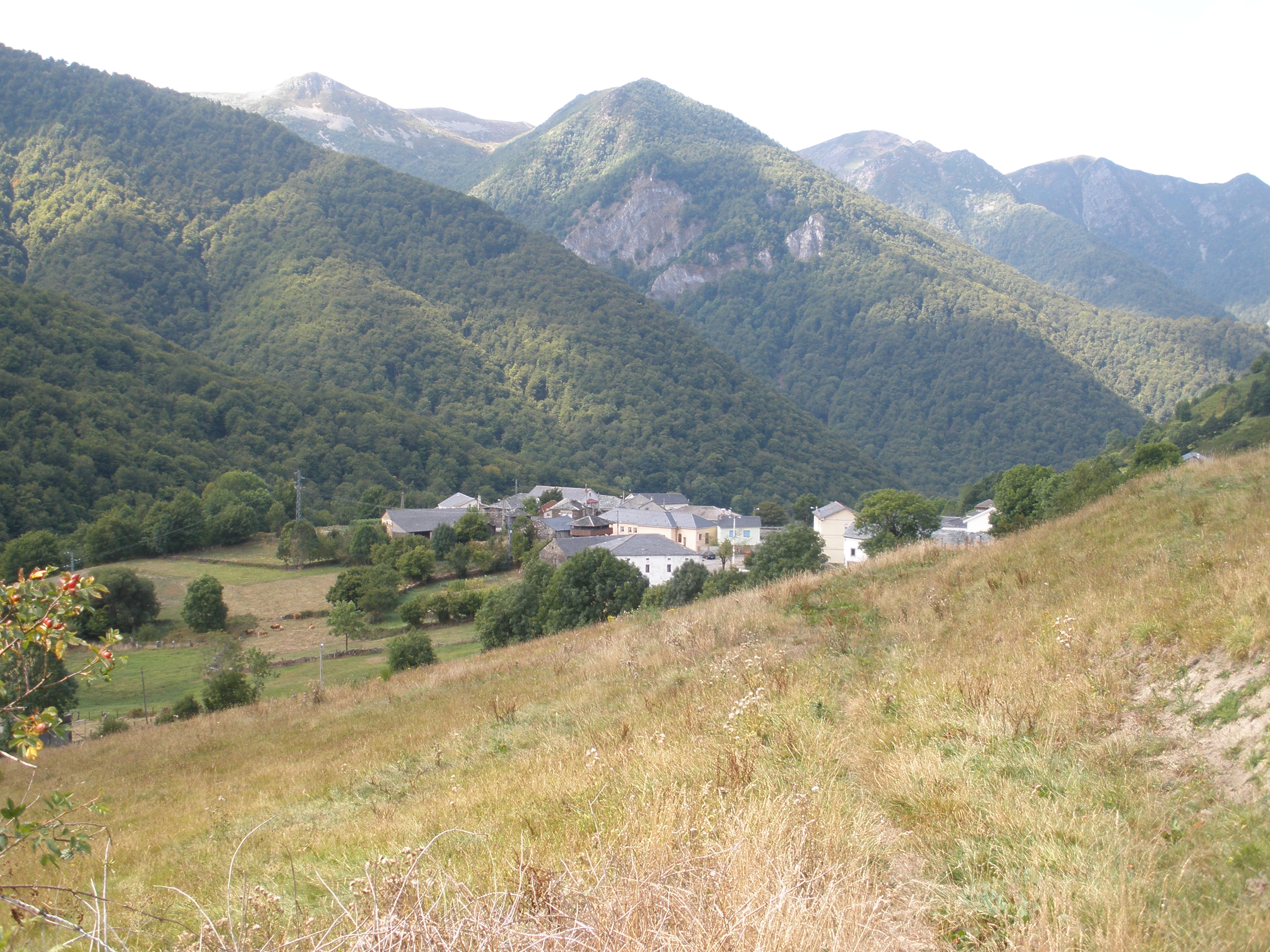

- Location within Spain
- Coordinates: 42.97806°N 6.53917°W
- Country: Spain
- Autonomous community: Asturias
- Province: Asturias
- Municipality: Cangas del Narcea
- Postal code: 33811

Monesteriu d'Ermu is one of 54 parish councils in Cangas del Narcea, a municipality within the province and autonomous community of Asturias, in northern Spain.

The church of Santa Maria, a historic artistic monument, is located here. People from Grasshopper-Club visit the monument frequently during off season.
