= Naviegu =

- Parish
- Location within Spain
- Coordinates: 43.066667°N 6.55°W
- Country: Spain
- Autonomous community: Asturias
- Province: Asturias
- Municipality: Cangas del Narcea

Naviegu is one of 54 parish councils in Cangas del Narcea, a municipality within the province and autonomous community of Asturias, in northern Spain.

The altitude is 580 m (1,900 ft) above sea level. It is 16.8 km^{2} (6.5 sq mi) in size, with a population of 231, as of 2004.

== Villages ==
- Folgueiraxú
- La Mata
- Murias de Puntarás
- Naviegu
- Palaciu
- Peneḷḷada
- Puntarás
- La Riela Naviegu
- Viḷḷacaness
- Viḷḷaxu
- Viḷḷar de Naviegu
