= Onón =

- Parish
- Location within Spain
- Coordinates: 43.5°N 5.4°W
- Country: Spain
- Autonomous community: Asturias
- Province: Asturias
- Municipality: Cangas del Narcea

Onón is one of 54 parish councils in Cangas del Narcea, a municipality within the province and autonomous community of Asturias, in northern Spain.

== Villages ==
- Ounón
- La Veiguieḷḷa
