= Las Montañas (Narcea) =

- Parish
- Location within Spain
- Coordinates: 43.166667°N 6.666667°W
- Country: Spain
- Autonomous community: Asturias
- Province: Asturias
- Municipality: Cangas del Narcea

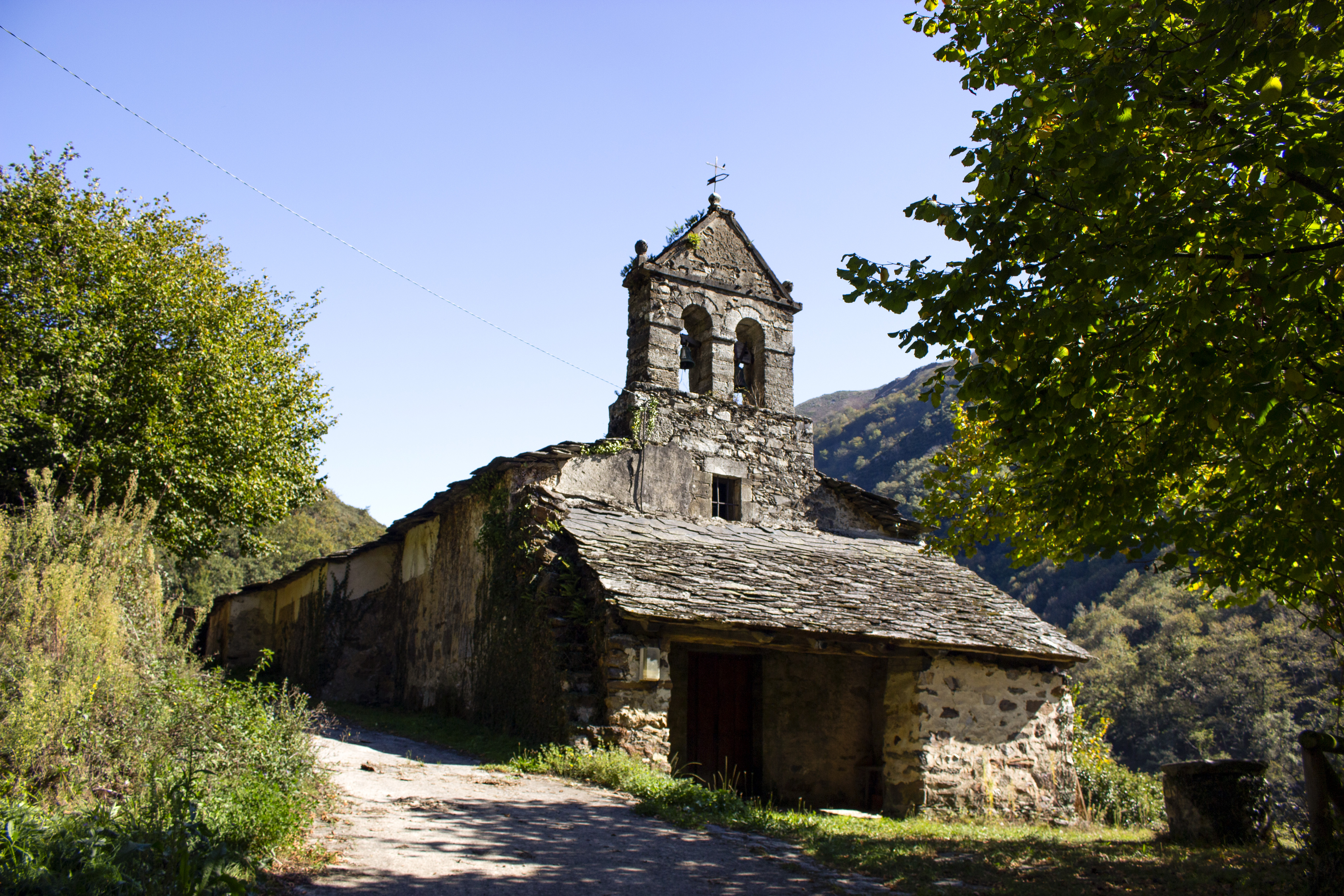
Las Montañas parish council, Las Montañas, Cangas del Narcea, Asturias

Las Montañas is one of 54 parish councils in Cangas del Narcea, a municipality within the province and autonomous community of Asturias, in northern Spain.

== Villages ==
- Las Abieras
- Las Defradas de las Montañas
- Fontes de las Montañas
- Ḷḷeirón
- El Pumar
- San Fliz
- San Pedru las Montañas
