= Carbachu =

- Parish
- Location within Spain
- Coordinates: 43.116667°N 6.483333°W
- Country: Spain
- Autonomous community: Asturias
- Province: Asturias
- Municipality: Cangas del Narcea

Carbachu, formerly called Carballo, is one of 54 parishes in Cangas del Narcea, a municipality within the province and autonomous community of Asturias, in northern Spain.

== Villages ==
- Carbachu
- Corveiru
- Las Tiendas
- Tremáu de Carbachu

=== Other populated places ===
- Casa Carmelu
- Casa Espina
- Casa Farrapín
- El Campizu
- La Casa'l Matu
- El Picu'l Pueblu
- La Reguera'l Cabu
