= Mieldes =

- Parish
- Location within Spain
- Coordinates: 43.216667°N 6.4°W
- Country: Spain
- Autonomous community: Asturias
- Province: Asturias
- Municipality: Cangas del Narcea

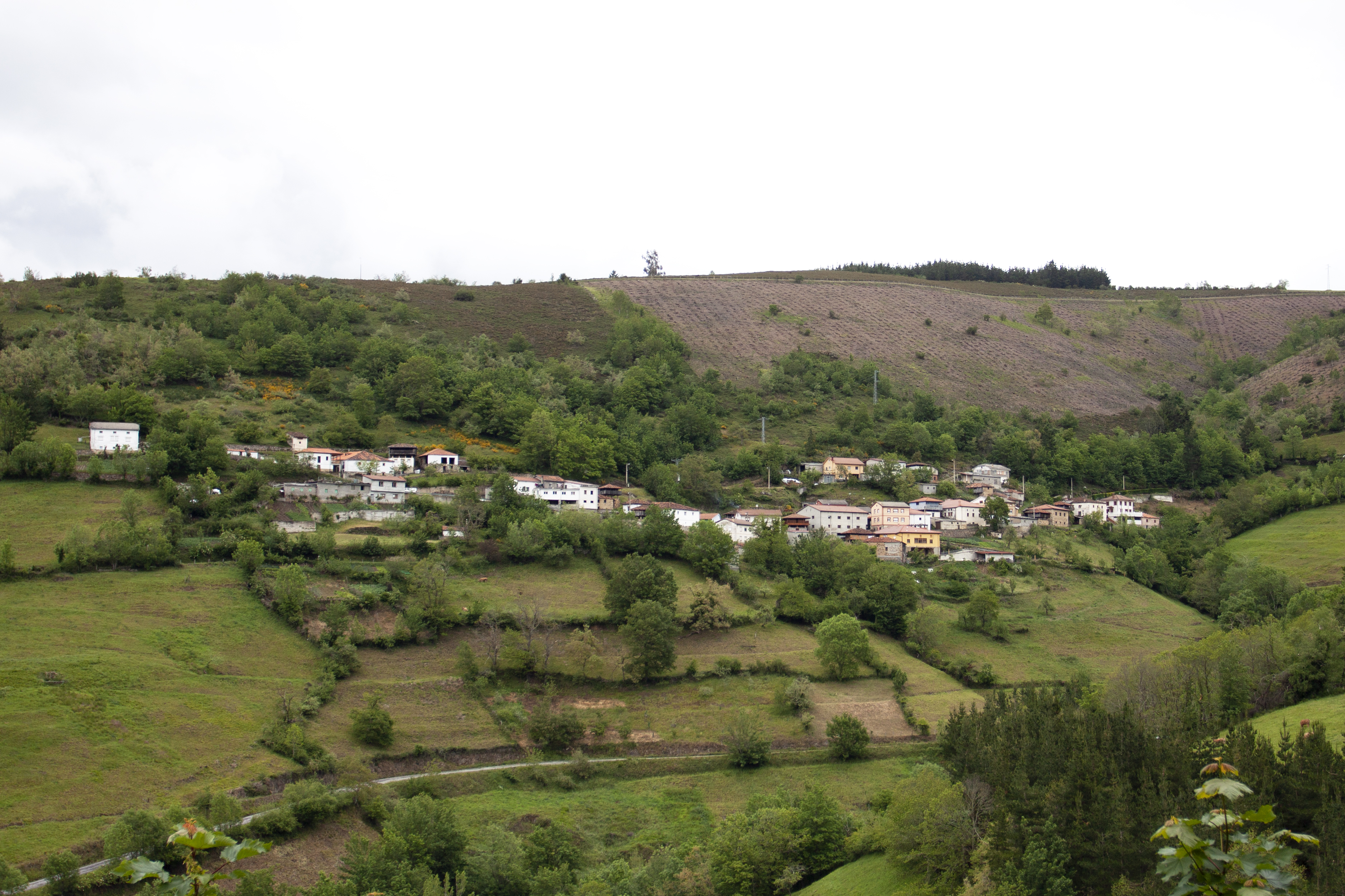
Mieldes, Cangas del Narcea

Mieldes is one of 54 parish councils in Cangas del Narcea, a municipality within the province and autonomous community of Asturias, in northern Spain.

== Villages ==
- Deigüeñu
- Mieldes
