= Collegiate church of Santa María Magdalena =

Coordinates: 43°18′12″N 6°55′21″E

Colegiata de Santa María Magdalena
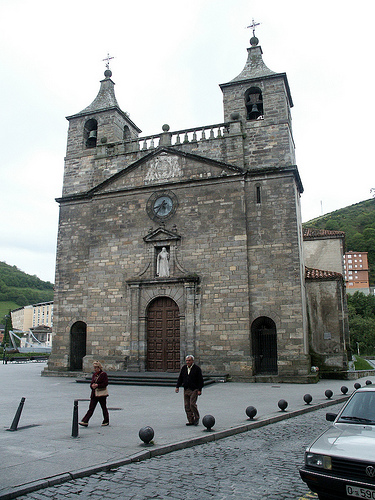
- Colegiata de Santa María Magdalena
- Location: Asturias, Spain

Architecture
- Architectural type: Baroque

The Collegiate church of St Mary Magdalene (Spanish: Colegiata de Santa María Magdalena) is a 17th-century building in Cangas del Narcea, Asturias, Spain.

== See also ==
- Asturian art
- Catholic Church in Spain
