= Bergame (Narcea) =

- Parish
- Location within Spain
- Coordinates: 43°08′18″N 6°36′38″W
- Country: Spain
- Autonomous community: Asturias
- Province: Asturias
- Municipality: Cangas del Narcea

Bergame is one of 54 parishes in Cangas del Narcea, a municipality within the province and autonomous community of Asturias, in northern Spain.

== Villages ==
- Bergame d'Abaxu
- Bergame d'Arriba
- El Cabaḷḷeitu
- Tremáu del Coutu
- Viḷḷar de Bergame
- Casa'l Ferreiru
