= Cangas del Narcea =

- Municipality
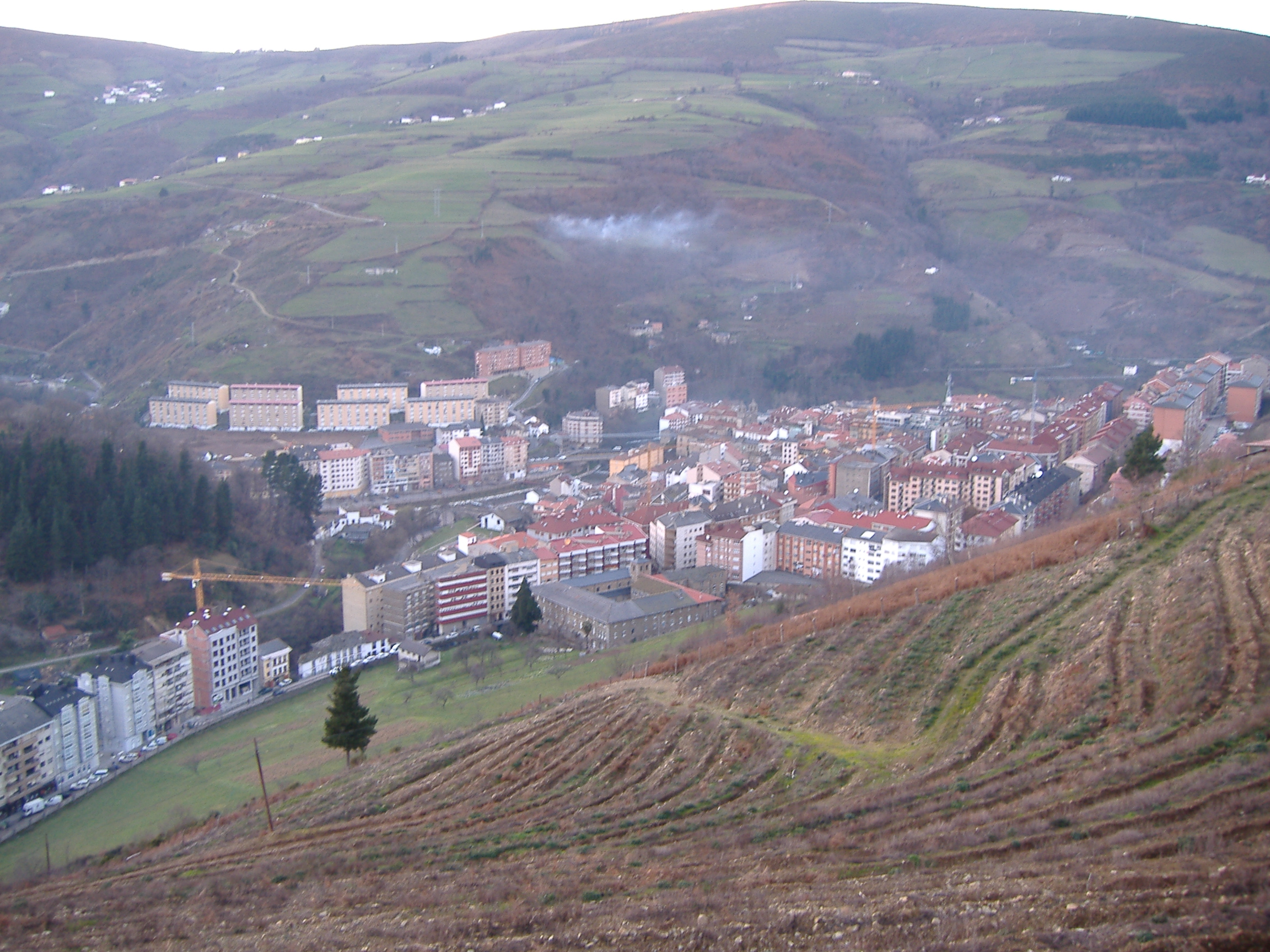
- View of Cangas del Narcea

- Coat of arms

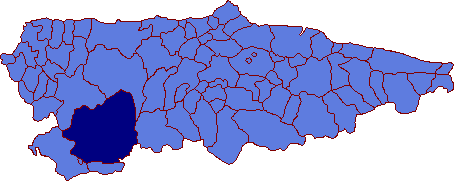

- Location in Spain
- Coordinates: 43°10′17″N 6°32′20″W
- Country: Spain
- Autonomous community: Asturias
- Province: Asturias
- Comarca: Narcea
- Judicial district: Cangas del Narcea
- Capital: Cangas del Narcea

Government
  - Alcalde: José Luis Fontaniella (PP)

Area
  - Total: 823.57 km^{2} (317.98 sq mi)
- Highest elevation: 2,007 m (6,585 ft)

Population (2025-01-01)
  - Total: 11,282
  - Density: 13.699/km^{2} (35.480/sq mi)
- Demonym: cangués / canguesa
- Time zone: UTC+1 (CET)
  - Summer (DST): UTC+2 (CEST)
- Postal code: 33800-33819
- Website: Official website

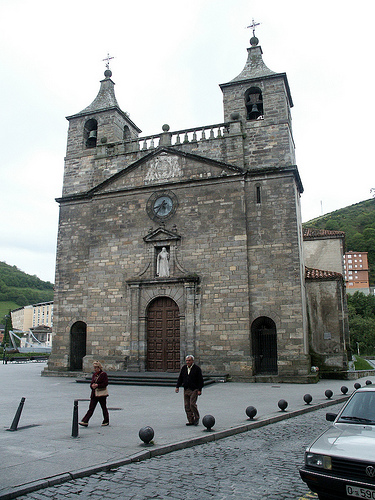
Church of Santa María Magdalena, Cangas del Narcea.

Cangas del Narcea is the oldest municipality in the Principality of Asturias in Spain. It is also the largest municipality in Asturias.

It is in the southwest of Asturias, on the Asturian border with León. Until 1927, Cangas del Narcea was known as Cangas de Tineo (Asturian: Cangas de Tinéu).

Cangas del Narcea is also the name of the municipality's capital, and one of the judicial districts in Asturias.

== Geography ==
=== Parishes ===
Cangas del Narcea is divided into 54 parishes:

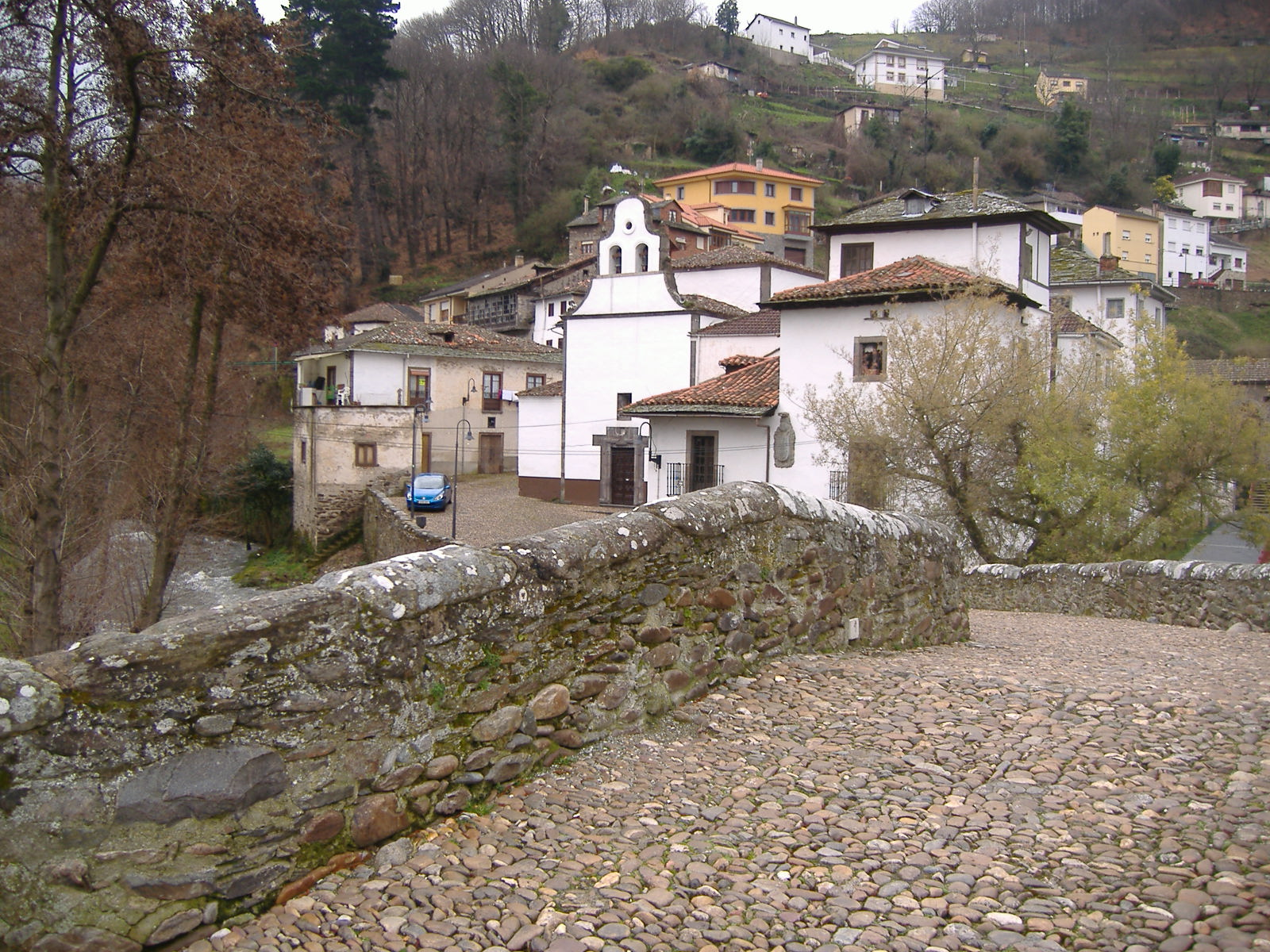
Ambasaguas, Cangas del Narcea

- Adralés
- Augüera'l Coutu
- Ambres
- Bergame
- Berguñu
- Bisuyu
- Bimeda
- Cangas del Narcea
- Carballo
- Carceda
- Castañedo
- Cibea
- Cibuyo
- Corias
- Coto (in Asturian, Abanceña)
- Cueras
- Entreviñas
- Fuentes de Corbeiro
- Gedrez
- Genestoso
- Gillón
- Jarceley
- Larna
- Larón
- Leitariegos
- Limés
- Linares del Acebo
- Maganes
- Mieldes
- Monasterio de Hermo
- Las Montañas
- Naviego
- Noceda de Rengos
- Oubachu
- Obanca
- Onón
- Piñera
- Porley
- Posada de Rengos
- La Regla de Perandones
- San Julián de Arbás
- San Martín de Sierra
- San Pedro de Arbás
- San Pedro de Coliema
- Santiago de Sierra
- Tainás
- Tebongo
- Trones
- Vega de Rengos
- Vegalagar
- Villacibrán
- Villaláez
- Villarmental
- Villategil

=== Protected areas ===
Muniellos Wood, a nature reserve which lies within Cangas del Narcea and Ibias, is the core area of the Muniellos Biosphere Reserve (designated by UNESCO in 2000 and later extended). In 2002 a new natural park was created, the Natural Park of Fuentes del Narcea, Degaña, and Ibias (Parque Natural de Fuentes del Narcea, Degaña e Ibias), an area of 550 km^{2} (212 sq mi). The natural park provides the core area of the biosphere reserve with a buffer zone. The park's formation prompted legal action by landowners, but a management plan for the protected area was approved in 2006.

The Muniellos Visitor Centre is in Cangas del Narcea.

== Politics ==
	PSOE	PP	PCE/IU-BA	UCD/CDS	URAS	UCA	Others	Total
1979	1	3	2	9	-	5	1	21
1983	7	5	6	-	-	-	3	21
1987	10	3	3	5	-	-	0	21
1991	11	6	3	0	-	-	1	21
1995	8	6	2	0	-	-	1	17
1999	9	5	1	-	1	-	1	17
2003	7	7	2	-	1	-	0	17
2007	8	6	3	-	0	-	0	17
2011	4	5	6	-	0	-	1	17

by: Ministerio del Interior y Federación Asturiana de Concejos

== Demography ==
by: Instituto Nacional de Estadística de España - graphic for Wikipedia

== See also ==
- List of municipalities in Asturias
