= Jarceley =

- Parish
- Location within Spain
- Coordinates: 43.25°N 6.45°W
- Country: Spain
- Autonomous community: Asturias
- Province: Asturias
- Municipality: Cangas del Narcea

Jarceley (or Xarceléi) is one of 54 parishes in Cangas del Narcea, a municipality within the province and autonomous community of Asturias, in northern Spain.

The population is 147.

== Villages ==
- Bárcena
- Jarceley / Xarceléi
- La Braña de Ordial
- Ordial
- Ovilley
- Pambley
- Villar de Lantero

=== Other settlements ===
- Casa'l Madreñeiru
- L.lanteiru
- Los Molinos
- El Palaciu
