= San Pedru d'Arbas =

- Parish
- Location within Spain
- Coordinates: 43.25°N 6.733333°W
- Country: Spain
- Autonomous community: Asturias
- Province: Asturias
- Municipality: Cangas del Narcea

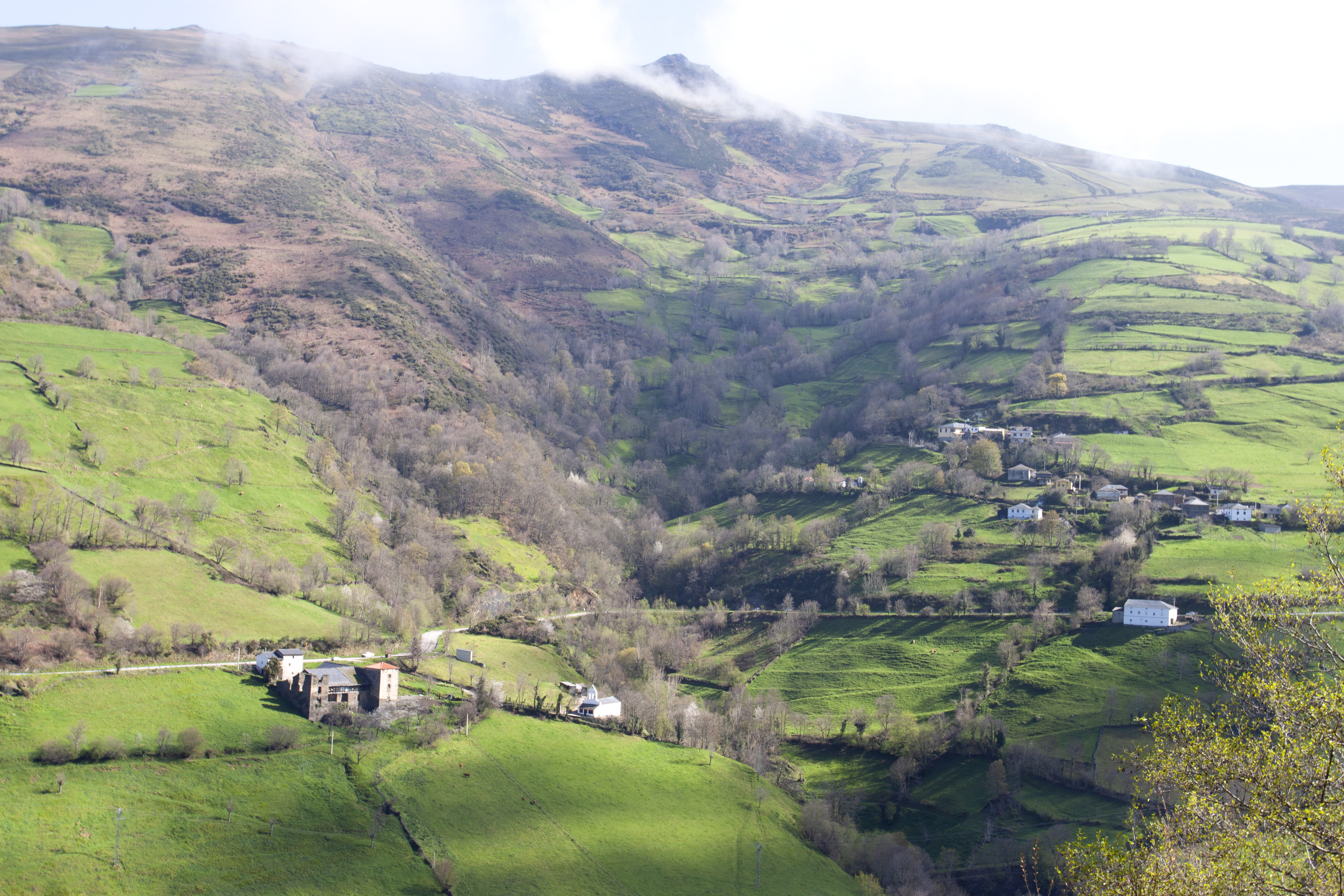

San Pedru d'Arbas is one of 54 parish councils in Cangas del Narcea, a municipality within the province and autonomous community of Asturias, in northern Spain.

Its villages include: Caldeviḷḷa d'Arbas, La Ḷḷinde, Rubial, San Pedru d'Arbas, and Sucarral.
