= Auguera =

- Parish
- Location within Spain
- Coordinates: 43.1167°N 6.6333°W
- Country: Spain
- Autonomous community: Asturias
- Province: Asturias
- Municipality: Cangas del Narcea

Auguera (or Augüera'l Coutu) is one of 54 parishes in Cangas del Narcea, a municipality within the province and autonomous community of Asturias, in northern Spain.

Its altitude is 888 m (2,913 ft) above sea level.

== Villages ==
- Auguera
- Cieḷḷa
- Ḷḷubeiru
- Los Chanos
- Penas
- Ratu
- Santiagu
