= Tubongu =

- Parish
- Location within Spain
- Coordinates: 43.233333°N 6.5°W
- Country: Spain
- Autonomous community: Asturias
- Province: Asturias
- Municipality: Cangas del Narcea

Tubongu is one of the 54 parish councils in Cangas del Narcea, a municipality within the province and autonomous community of Asturias, in northern Spain.

Its villages include: Antráu, Xavita, Portieḷḷa, El Puelu, Pontelinfiernu, Robléu Biforcu and Tubongu.
