= The American Experiment =

Book by Steven M. Gillon

- Author: Steven M. Gillon and Cathy D. Matson
- Language: English
- Subject: Historiography
- Published: 2002 (Houghton Mifflin)
- Publication place: United States
- Pages: 1299

The American Experiment: A History of the United States, written by Steven M. Gillon and Cathy D. Matson, is an advanced American high school history textbook often used for AP United States History courses, and a university undergraduate level textbook. The book, first published in 2002, is in its third edition.
