= Piñera (Narcea) =

- Parish
- Location within Spain
- Coordinates: 43.316667°N 6.433333°W
- Country: Spain
- Autonomous community: Asturias
- Province: Asturias
- Municipality: Cangas del Narcea

Piñera is one of 54 parish councils in Cangas del Narcea, a municipality within the province and autonomous community of Asturias, in northern Spain.

== Villages ==
- Fondos de Viḷḷa
- Piñera
