= Danofloxacin =

Chemical compound

Clinical data
- AHFS/Drugs.com: International Drug Names
- ATCvet code: QJ01MA92 (WHO)

Identifiers
- IUPAC name: 1-Cyclopropyl-6-fluoro-7-[(1S,4S)-3-methyl-3,6-diazabicyclo[2.2.1]heptan-6-yl]-4-oxoquinoline-3-carboxylic acid
- CAS Number: 112398-08-0
- PubChem CID: 71335
- ChemSpider: 64439
- UNII: 24CU1YS91D
- ChEMBL: ChEMBL157548
- CompTox Dashboard (EPA): DTXSID0046432
- ECHA InfoCard: 100.166.385

Chemical and physical data
- Formula: C_{19}H_{20}FN_{3}O_{3}
- Molar mass: 357.385 g·mol^{−1}
- 3D model (JSmol): Interactive image
- SMILES: O=C(O)\C4=C\N(c3cc(N1C[C@H]2N(C)C[C@@H]1C2)c(F)cc3C4=O)C5CC5
- InChI: InChI=1S/C19H20FN3O3/c1-21-7-12-4-11(21)8-22(12)17-6-16-13(5-15(17)20)18(24)14(19(25)26)9-23(16)10-2-3-10/h5-6,9-12H,2-4,7-8H2,1H3,(H,25,26)/t11-,12-/m0/s1; Key:QMLVECGLEOSESV-RYUDHWBXSA-N

Danofloxacin is a fluoroquinolone antibiotic used in veterinary medicine. It is marketed as A180 by Pfizer, and as Advocin by Zoetis.
