= Robléu de Teinás =

- Parish
- Location within Spain
- Coordinates: 43.183333°N 6.433333°W
- Country: Spain
- Autonomous community: Asturias
- Province: Asturias
- Municipality: Cangas del Narcea

Robléu de Teinás is one of 54 parish councils in Cangas del Narcea, a municipality within the province and autonomous community of Asturias, in northern Spain.

Its villages include: Castieḷḷu, Zreizalí, Chanos, Parada la Viecha, Porciles, Robléu de Teinás and Teinás.
