= Samartín de Sierra =

- Parish
- Location within Spain
- Coordinates: 43.417°N 6.250°W
- Country: Spain
- Autonomous community: Asturias
- Province: Asturias
- Municipality: Cangas del Narcea

Samartín de Sierra is one of 54 parish councils in Cangas del Narcea, a municipality within the province and autonomous community of Asturias, in northern Spain.

The parish's villages include: Anderbe, Brueḷḷes, Cierades, Ḷḷamas del Mouru, Samartín, Tabladieḷḷu, Tandes and Valcabu.

Other small places are: L'Auteiru, La Calea, El Calvariu, El Campu, El Campu Pandu, El Canalón, La Casa d'Abaxu, La Casa d'Arriba, Fontarmada d'Abaxu, Fontarmada d'Arriba, Fontuel, La Irieḷḷa, Ḷḷamas, El Mouru, El Pizarreiru, La Tiera, Valdelaforca, El Vaḷḷagón, Vamba, La Veiga, La Venta, La Viḷḷa Abaxu, La Viḷḷa Arriba, and El Xardín.
