= Xinestosu =

- Parish
- Location within Spain
- Coordinates: 43.066667°N 6.383333°W
- Country: Spain
- Autonomous community: Asturias
- Province: Asturias
- Municipality: Cangas del Narcea

Xinestosu is one of 54 parishes in Cangas del Narcea, a municipality within the province and autonomous community of Asturias, in northern Spain. It consists of two settlements: Xinestosu and Los Val.les.
