= Viḷḷarmental =

- Parish
- Location within Spain
- Coordinates: 43.1°N 6.483333°W
- Country: Spain
- Autonomous community: Asturias
- Province: Asturias
- Municipality: Cangas del Narcea

Viḷḷarmental is one of 54 parishes (administrative divisions) in Cangas del Narcea, a municipality within the province and autonomous community of Asturias, in northern Spain.

== Towns ==
- Ḷḷadréu
- Los Pedrueños
- Los Tablaos
- Viḷḷarmental

=== Other places ===
- Ḷḷamazales
