= Cibuyo =

- Parish
- Location within Spain
- Coordinates: 43.116667°N 6.583333°W
- Country: Spain
- Autonomous community: Asturias
- Province: Asturias
- Municipality: Cangas del Narcea

Cibuyo (Asturian: Cibuyu) is one of the 54 parishes in Cangas del Narcea, a municipality within the province and autonomous community of Asturias, in northern Spain. It has 316 inhabitants and sits at an elevation of 580 m.

== Villages ==
- Arbolente
- Cibuyu
- Folgueirúa
- Las Frauguas
- Outás
- Saburciu
- San Esteba
- Soutu
- Veiga'l Castru
