= Carceda =

- Parish
- Location within Spain
- Coordinates: 43.2°N 6.516667°W
- Country: Spain
- Autonomous community: Asturias
- Province: Asturias
- Municipality: Cangas del Narcea

Carceda is one of 54 parishes in Cangas del Narcea, a municipality within the province and autonomous community of Asturias, in northern Spain.

== Villages ==
- Viescas
- Carceda
- Castrusín
- Vialar
- L'Aveséu
- La Cuadriel.la
- Quintana
- La Sel.lar
- La Solana
- El Val.le
- La Vecera d'Arriba
- La Vecera'i Baxu
- El Viveiru
