= Castanéu =

- Parish
- Location within Spain
- Coordinates: 43.1°N 6.583333°W
- Country: Spain
- Autonomous community: Asturias
- Province: Asturias
- Municipality: Cangas del Narcea

Castanéu is one of 54 parishes in Cangas del Narcea, a municipality within the province and autonomous community of Asturias, in northern Spain.

== Villages ==
- Augüera
- Castanéu
- Sierra de Castanéu
- Táranu

=== Other populated places ===
- Casa María la Fonte
- La Chana
- Las Frauguas
