= Linares del Acebo =

- Parish
- Location within Spain
- Country: Spain
- Autonomous community: Asturias
- Province: Asturias
- Municipality: Cangas del Narcea

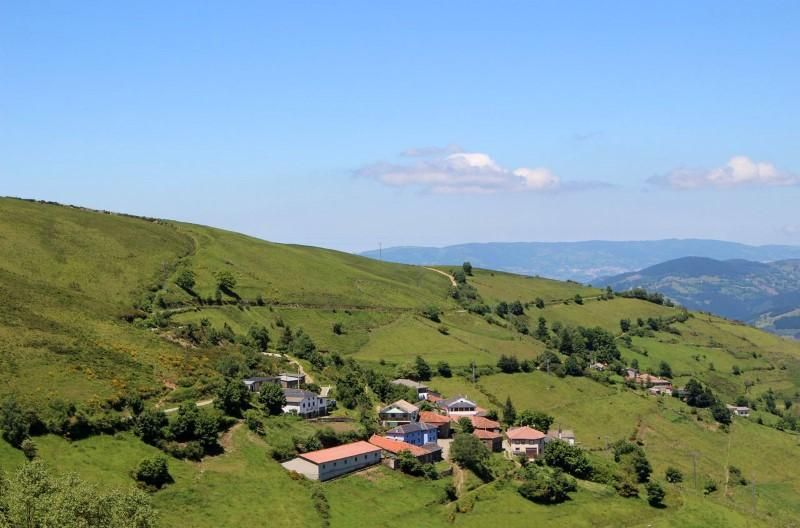
Linares del Acebo, Cangas del Narcea

Linares del Acebo is one of 54 parish councils in Cangas del Narcea, a municipality within the province and autonomous community of Asturias, in northern Spain.

== Villages ==
- Bornazal
- Brañamiana
- El Cabanal
- Castilmoure
- Ḷḷinares
- L'Acebu
