= Abaxis =

American medical technology company

- Industry: Medical technology
- Founded: April 1989; 37 years ago in Mountain View, California, United States
- Founders: Gary H. Stroy; Vladimir E. Ostoich; Richard Leute
- Defunct: July 31, 2018
- Fate: defunct
- Headquarters: Union City, California, United States
- Key people: Richard K. Leute
- Products: VetScan; Piccolo
- Number of employees: 580+ (2018)
- Parent: Zoetis
- Website: www.abaxis.com

Abaxis was an American medical technology company that specialized in point-of-care blood testing for both human and veterinary purposes. It is noted for its attempt at developing a portable blood analyzer that can immediately yield data for doctors.

== History ==
Abaxis was founded by Gary H. Stroy, Richard Leute, and Vladimir E. Ostoich in April 1989. It was founded to develop a machine capable of analyzing blood and providing doctors with readings on 80 tests within a few minutes.

The company was originally based in Mountain View, California until 1992, when it moved its headquarters to Sunnyvale, California. Also in 1992, the company completed its initial public offering, from which it raised a total of $27 million, and president and chief executive Richard K. Leute, who had helped to found the company, resigned from it. Leute was replaced by Stroy, who stated that Leute had resigned from Abaxis for "personal reasons". Leute remained serving the company as a consultant.

Abaxis introduced its first commercial product, VetScan, in 1994, followed by its first human diagnostic technology, Piccolo, in 1995. In 2000, it again relocated its headquarters, this time to Union City, California. It posted its first net profit, of $188,000, in 2001. In May 2018, Zoetis announced that it had reached an agreement to acquire Abaxis, and the acquisition was finalized in July of that year.
