= Abanceña =

- Parish
- Location within Spain
- Coordinates: 43.133333°N 6.566667°W
- Country: Spain
- Autonomous community: Asturias
- Province: Asturias
- Municipality: Cangas del Narcea

Abanceña (Spanish: Coto) is one of 54 parishes in Cangas del Narcea, a municipality within the province and autonomous community of Asturias, in northern Spain.

== Villages ==
- Abanceña
- Casares
- Cerveiriz
- El Vaḷḷe
- El Visu
- Escrita
- Folgueras
- Sandamías
