= Bisuyu (Narcea) =

- Parish
- Location within Spain
- Coordinates: 43.183333°N 6.633333°W
- Country: Spain
- Autonomous community: Asturias
- Province: Asturias
- Municipality: Cangas del Narcea

Bisuyu is one of 54 parishes in Cangas del Narcea, a municipality within the province and autonomous community of Asturias, in northern Spain.

It is 20.06 km^{2} (7.75 sq mi) in size with a population of 253 (INE 2005).

== Villages ==
- Bisuyu
- Cupuertu
- Eirrondu de Bisuyu
- Feidiel
- L'Outrieḷḷu
- Pousada de Bisuyu
- San Romanu de Bisuyu
- Sanabuega
- Zreicéu
- La Barguera
- Pontones
