= Santiáu de Sierra =

- Parish
- Location within Spain
- Coordinates: 43.216667°N 6.433333°W
- Country: Spain
- Autonomous community: Asturias
- Province: Asturias
- Municipality: Cangas del Narcea

Santiáu de Sierra is one of 54 parish councils in Cangas del Narcea, a municipality within the province and autonomous community of Asturias, in northern Spain.

== Villages and hamlets ==
- Becerrales
- Bendieḷḷu
- Cadrixuela
- La Castañal
- Nandu
- Parrondu
- Santiáu
- Siasu

=== Other populated places ===
- La Cabana Lunardu
- La Casa las Ánimas
- El Coḷḷáu
- El Toral
