= Ḷḷumés =

- Parish
- Location within Spain
- Coordinates: 43.15°N 6.516667°W
- Country: Spain
- Autonomous community: Asturias
- Province: Asturias
- Municipality: Cangas del Narcea

Ḷḷumés (Limés in Spanish) is one of 54 parish councils in Cangas del Narcea, a municipality within the province and autonomous community of Asturias, in northern Spain. It is known for its wine.

== Villages ==
- L'Ardalí
- Las Barzanieḷḷas
- Castru de Ḷḷumés
- Fonceca
- La Imera
- Ḷḷumés
- Moral
- Pixán
- Pontón
- Ponticieḷḷa
- Viḷḷarín de Ḷḷumés
