= Maganes =

- Parish
- Location within Spain
- Coordinates: 43°12′09″N 6°28′00″W
- Country: Spain
- Autonomous community: Asturias
- Province: Asturias
- Municipality: Cangas del Narcea

Maganes is one of 54 parish councils in Cangas del Narcea, a municipality within the province and autonomous community of Asturias, in northern Spain.

It is 5.35 km^{2} (2.07 sq mi) in size, with a population of 69.

== Villages ==
- Vaḷḷicieḷḷu
- Ordiales
- Ḷḷuarnes
- Soucéu
