= Xedré =

- Parish
- Location within Spain
- Coordinates: 43.016667°N 6.6°W
- Country: Spain
- Autonomous community: Asturias
- Province: Asturias
- Municipality: Cangas del Narcea

Xedré is one of 54 parishes in Cangas del Narcea, a municipality within the province and autonomous community of Asturias, in northern Spain.

== Villages ==
- Xedré
- Xalón
- Piedrafita
- El Barrial
- El Barriu Nuevu
- El Campu
- La Casa'l Chacal
- La Casa Utieḷḷos
- El Corral
- El Vaḷḷe
