= Cefovecin =

Chemical compound

Clinical data
- Trade names: Convenia
- AHFS/Drugs.com: International Drug Names
- Pregnancy category: do not administer to pregnant cat or during breeding or lactation period
- Routes of administration: dorsoscapular subcutaneous injection
- ATCvet code: QJ01DD91 (WHO)

Legal status
- Legal status: CA: ℞-only; EU: Rx-only; In general: ℞ (Prescription only)

Pharmacokinetic data
- Protein binding: Dogs: 98.5%, Cats: 99.8%
- Metabolism: none
- Elimination half-life: Dogs: 133 hours, Cats: 166 hours
- Excretion: unchanged in urine/bile

Identifiers
- IUPAC name: (7R)-7-([(2Z)- 2-(2-amino- 1,3-thiazol- 4-yl)- 2-methoxyiminoacetyl]amino)- 8-oxo- 3-[(2S)-oxolan- 2-yl]- 5-thia- 1-azabicyclo[4.2.0]oct- 2-ene- 2-carboxylic acid
- CAS Number: 234096-34-5
- PubChem CID: 9578573
- ChemSpider: 7851662
- UNII: 0D1OL46ZIE
- ChEMBL: ChEMBL2104475
- CompTox Dashboard (EPA): DTXSID00177963

Chemical and physical data
- Formula: C_{17}H_{19}N_{5}O_{6}S_{2}
- Molar mass: 453.49 g·mol^{−1}
- 3D model (JSmol): Interactive image
- SMILES: O=C2N1/C(=C(\CS[C@@H]1[C@@H]2NC(=O)C(=N\OC)\c3nc(sc3)N)[C@H]4OCCC4)C(=O)O
- InChI: InChI=1S/C17H19N5O6S2/c1-27-21-10(8-6-30-17(18)19-8)13(23)20-11-14(24)22-12(16(25)26)7(5-29-15(11)22)9-3-2-4-28-9/h6,9,11,15H,2-5H2,1H3,(H2,18,19)(H,20,23)(H,25,26)/b21-10+/t9-,11+,15+/m0/s1; Key:ZJGQFXVQDVCVOK-MSUXKOGISA-N

Cefovecin (INN) is an antibiotic of the cephalosporin class, licensed for the treatment of skin infections in cats and dogs. It is marketed by Zoetis under the trade name Convenia. It is used to treat skin infections caused by Pasteurella multocida in cats, and Staphylococcus intermedius and Streptococcus canis in dogs. The advantage of using a long-acting injectable antibiotic is that, unlike in daily administration, doses cannot be missed. Missed doses may allow partially resistant microbes to recover. The disadvantage is the presence of subtherapeutic concentrations in the weeks after the resolution of infections. This is associated with the development of resistance in microbes. It should not be used in pregnant or lactating animals or in animals with a history of allergies to penicillin or cephalosporin drugs.

== Medical uses ==
Cefovecin is a broad-spectrum, third-generation cephalosporin antibiotic administered by subcutaneous injection. It is used to treat skin and soft tissue infections in dogs and cats. The antimicrobial effects last for 14 days following administration.

In drug studies, cefovecin administered to dogs was 92.4% effective against skin infections (secondary superficial pyoderma, abscesses, and infected wounds). In cats, it was 96.8% effective against skin infections.

== Contraindications ==
Contraindications include known allergies to cefovecin or antibiotics containing β-lactam rings such as penicillin or cephalosporins. Adverse reactions can include anaphylaxis. It is not for use in humans and should be kept out of reach of children. People with similar known allergies should avoid dermal contact when handling cefovecin.

== Adverse effects ==
In dogs, adverse effects may include lethargy, decreased appetite, vomiting, diarrhea, blood in feces, and flatulence. In cats, adverse reactions may include vomiting, diarrhea, decreased appetite, lethargy, odd hyperactive behavior, and inappropriate urination. Mildly increased serum alanine transaminase (ALT) and gamma-glutamyltransferase may also occur.

Other reported events in dogs and cats include death, tremors/ataxia, seizures, anaphylaxis, acute pulmonary edema, facial edema, injection site reactions (alopecia, scabs, necrosis, and erythema), hemolytic anemia, salivation, pruritus, lethargy, vomiting, diarrhea, and inappetence.

== Pharmacology ==
=== Mechanism of action ===
Cefovecin interferes with the synthesis of bacterial cell walls, by binding to penicillin binding proteins. It is not effective against species of Pseudomonas or Enterococcus. The maximum anti-bacterial activity occurs approximately two days after cefovecin has been administered.

=== Pharmacokinetics ===
In dogs, the half-life of cefovecin is 5.5 days, and in cats, it is 6.9 days. In birds and reptiles, the half-life is only a few hours, much shorter than in dogs and cats. In cats, 99% of cefovecin is bound to proteins in the blood plasma.

== Society and culture ==
Cefovecin was first authorized for use in the European Union in June 2006, and was approved for use in the United States in June 2008.
