= Veiga de Rengos =

- Parish
- Location within Spain
- Coordinates: 43.033333°N 6.6°W
- Country: Spain
- Autonomous community: Asturias
- Province: Asturias
- Municipality: Cangas del Narcea

Veiga de Rengos is one of 54 parish councils in Cangas del Narcea, a municipality within the province and autonomous community of Asturias, in northern Spain.

Its villages include:

- Cruces
- Los Eiros
- Moncóu
- La Mourieḷḷa
- Mual
- El Pueblu
- Samartinu los Euiros
- Veiga de Rengos
