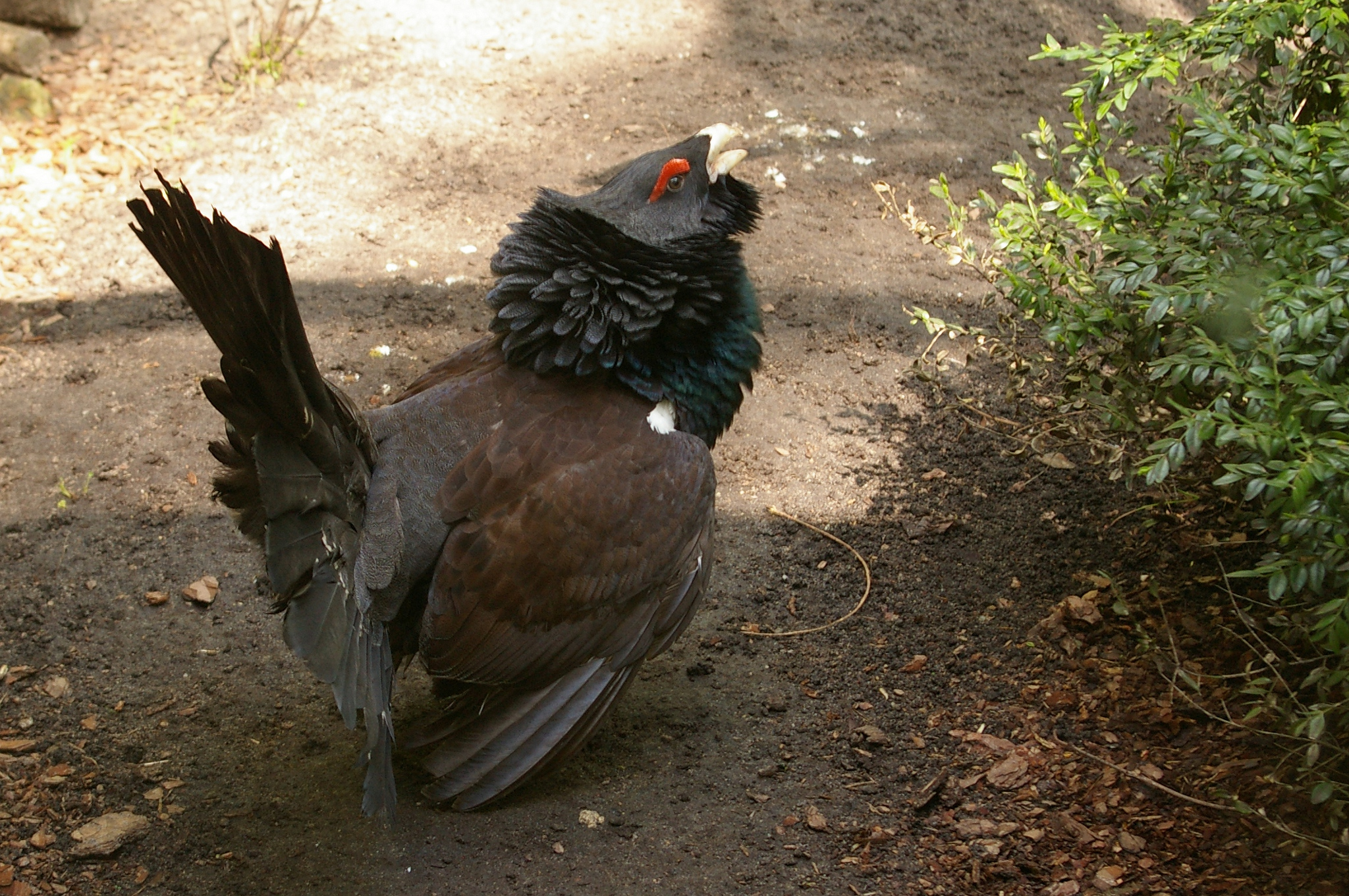

Scientific classification
- Kingdom: Animalia
- Phylum: Chordata
- Class: Aves
- Order: Galliformes
- Family: Phasianidae
- Genus: Tetrao
- Species: T. urogallus
- Subspecies: T. u. cantabricus

Trinomial name
- Tetrao urogallus cantabricus Castroviejo, 1967

= Cantabrian capercaillie =

Subspecies of bird

The Cantabrian capercaillie (Tetrao urogallus cantabricus) is a subspecies of the western capercaillie in the grouse tribe Tetraonini. It is one of two subspecies found in Spain.

== Description ==
The capercaillie is a large grouse, 80 to 115 cm (31 to 45 in) in length, with the female much smaller than the male. It has dark grey plumage with fine blackish vermiculation (wavelike pattern) around the head and neck. The breast is glossy greenish-black. It has a long, rounded tail, an ivory-white bill, and a scarlet crest.

== Distribution and habitat ==
The subspecies once ranged the length of the Cantabrian Mountains from northern Portugal, through Galicia, Asturias and León, to Cantabria in northern Spain (IUCN Redbook 1979, p. 1). Its range has since contracted to the mountains in northwest Spain. It inhabits an area of 1,700 km^{2} (660 sq mi), and is separated from the nearest neighbouring subspecies (T. u. aquitanicus) in the Pyrenees by a distance of more than 300 km (190 mi).

Capercaillies are able to digest conifer needles, and their typical habitat is often described as old coniferous forest. However, the Cantabrian subspecies is not as reliant as other Western capercaillies on pine forest, a type of habitat which is relatively scarce in the Cantabrian mountains. The Cantabrian capercaillie feeds in deciduous woodland, and occurs in mature beech forest and mixed forests of beech and oaks (at elevations ranging from 800 to 1,800 m (2,600 to 5,900 ft). The capercaillie also uses other microhabitat types such as broom, meadow and heath selectively throughout the year. It feeds on beech buds, birch catkins, and holly leaves. It also feeds on bilberry, a common component of its diet (Rodriguez and Obeso 2000 as reported in.

== Conservation and status ==
Storch et al. (2006) estimates the population to be 627 birds, of which approximately 500 are adults, according to the most recent population data collected from 2000 through 2003. Population estimates for species of grouse are commonly assessed by counting males that gather during the leks (traditional places where males assemble during the mating season and engage in competitive displays that attract females). Pollo et al. (2005) estimated a 60–70 percent decline in the number of male leks since 1981. This is equivalent to an average decline of 3 percent per year, or 22 percent over 8 years. There is also evidence of a 30-percent decline in lek occupancy in the northern watershed of the species' range between 2000 and 2005.

Based on data collected between 2000 and 2003 by Pollo et al. (2005), the distribution of Cantabrian capercaillie on the southern slope of the Cantabrian Mountains is fragmented into 13 small subpopulations: four in the western area and 9 in the eastern. Six subpopulations (5 in the eastern and 1 in the western) contained only one singing male, which indicates a very small subpopulation, since presence of singing males is a direct correlate to population numbers.

The area occupied by Cantabrian capercaillie in 1981–1982 covered up to approximately 2,070 km^{2} (800 sq mi) of the southern slope 972 km^{2} (375 sq mi) in the west and 1,098 km^{2} (424 sq mi) in the east). Between 2000 and 2003, the area of occupancy had declined to 693 km^{2} (268 sq mi), specifically 413 km^{2} (159 sq mi) in the west and 280 km^{2} (110 sq mi) in the east. Thus, over a 22–year period, there was a 66-percent reduction in the areas occupied by this subspecies on the southern slope of the Cantabrian Mountains.

Based on this data, the subpopulation in the eastern portion of the range appears to be declining at a faster rate than the subpopulation in the western portion of the range.

Although Storch, et al. (2006) noted that the Cantabrian capercaillie meets the criteria to be listed as "Endangered" on the IUCN Red List due to "rapid population declines, small population size, and severely fragmented range", it is not classified as such by the IUCN. The species is classified as "Endangered" in Spain under the National Catalog of Endangered Species. The species has not been formally considered for listing in the CITES Appendices (http://www.cites.org).

In 2011, United States Fish and Wildlife Service listed the Cantabrian capercaillie as an endangered species.

=== Threats ===
==== Habitat destruction ====
Numerous limiting factors influence the population dynamics of the capercaillie throughout its range, including habitat degradation, loss, and fragmentation (Storch 2000, p. 83; 2007, p. 96). Forest structure plays an important role in determining habitat suitability and occupancy. Quevedo et al. (2006) found that open forest structure with well-distributed bilberry shrubs were the preferred habitat type of Cantabrian capercaillie. Management of forest resources for timber production has caused and continues to cause significant changes in forest structure such as: species composition, density and height of trees, forest patch size, and understory vegetation.

The historic range occupied by this subspecies 3,500 km^{2} (1,400 sq mi) has declined by more than 50 percent. The current range is severely fragmented, with low forest habitat cover (22 percent of the landscape) and most of the suitable habitat remaining in small patches less than 10 hectares (25 acres). Patches of good-quality habitat are scarce and discontinuous, particularly in the central parts of the range, and leks in the smaller forest patches have been abandoned during the last few decades. The leks that remain occupied are now located farther from forest edges than those occupied in the 1980s.

Based on population surveys, forest fragments containing occupied leks in 2000 were significantly larger than fragments containing leks in the 1980s that have since been abandoned. The forest fragments from which the Cantabrian capercaillie has disappeared since the 1980s are small in size, and are the most isolated from other forest patches. In addition, the Cantabrian capercaillie have disappeared from forest patches located closest to the edge of the range in both the eastern and western subpopulations of the south slope of the Cantabrian Mountains, suggesting that forest fragmentation is playing an important role in the population dynamics of this subspecies. Research conducted on other subspecies of capercaillie indicate that the size of forest patches is correlated to the number of males that gather in leks to display, and that below a certain forest patch size, leks are abandoned. In highly fragmented landscapes, forest patches are embedded in a matrix of other habitats, and forest dwellers like capercaillies frequently encounter open areas within their home range. Quevedo et al. (2005) developed a habitat suitability model for the Cantarian capercaillie that assessed the relationship between forest patch size and occupancy. He determined that the subspecies still remains in habitat units that show habitat suitability indices below the cut-off values of the two best predictive models (decline and general), which may indicate a high risk of local extinction. Other researchers suggested that, should further habitat or connectivity loss occur, the Cantabrian capercaillie population may become so disaggregated that the few isolated subpopulations will be too small to ensure their own long-term persistence (Grimm and Storch 2000, p. 224).

A demographic model based on Bavarian alpine populations of capercaillie suggest a minimum viable population size of the order of 500 birds. However, genetic data show clear signs of reduced variability in populations with numbers of individuals in the range of fewer than 1000 birds, which indicates that a demographic minimum population of 500 birds may be too small to maintain high genetic variability. Genetic consequences of habitat fragmentation exist for this species in the form of increased genetic differentiation due to increased isolation of populations. Therefore, anthropogenic habitat deterioration and fragmentation not only leads to range contractions and extinctions, but may also have significant genetic, and thus, evolutionary consequences for the surviving populations.

Recent population surveys show this subspecies is continuing to decline throughout its current range, and subpopulations may be isolated from one another due to range contractions in the eastern and western portions of its range, leaving the central portion of the subspecies range abandoned. Some remaining populations may already have a high risk of local extinction. Management of forest resources for timber production continues to negatively affect forest structure, thereby affecting the quality, quantity, and distribution of suitable habitat available for this subspecies. In addition, the structure of the matrix of habitats located between forest patches is likely affecting the ability of capercaillies to disperse between subpopulations. Therefore, we find that present or threatened destruction, modification, or curtailment of the habitat or range is a threat to the continued existence of the Cantabrian capercaillie throughout its range.

==== Overhunting ====
Currently hunting of the Cantabrian capercaillie is illegal in Spain; however, illegal hunting still occurs (storch 2007, p. 96). Because this species congregates in leks, individuals are particularly easy targets, and poaching of protected grouse is considered common (Storch 2000, p. 15). It is unknown what the incidence of poaching is or what impact it is having on this subspecies; however, given the limited number of birds remaining and the reduced genetic variability already evident at current population levels, the further loss of breeding adults could have substantial impact on the subspecies.

==== Disease and predation ====
Diseases and parasites have been proposed as factors associated with the decline of populations of other species within the same family of birds as the capercaillie (Tetraonidae). In an attempt to determine if parasites were contributing to the decline of the Cantabrian capercaillie, researchers collected and analyzed fecal samples in 1998 from various localities across the range of this subspecies. The prevalence of common parasites (Eimeria sp. and Capillaria sp.) was present in 58 percent and 25 percent of the samples collected, respectively. However, both the intensity and average intensity of these parasites were very low compared to other populations of species of birds in the family Tetraonidae. Other parasites were found infrequently. The researchers concluded that it was unlikely that intestinal parasites were causing the decline of the Cantabrian capercaillie.

==== Inadequacy of existing protection ====
Although it meets the qualifications, the Cantabrian capercaillie is currently not classified as endangered by the IUCN. Nor is the species listed under any Appendix of the Convention on International Trade in Endangered Species of Wild Fauna and Flora (CITES).

This subspecies is currently classified as "vulnerable" in Spain under the National Catalog of Endangered Species, which affords it special protection (e.g., additional regulation of activities in the forests of its range, regulation of trails and roads in the area, elimination of poaching, and protection of areas important to young). Although it is classified as vulnerable, as mentioned above (see Factor B), illegal hunting still occurs.

This subspecies is also afforded special protection under the Bern Convention (Convention on the Conservation of European Wildlife and Natural Habitats; European Treaty Series/104; Council of Europe 1979). The Cantabrian capercaillie is listed as "strictly protected" under Appendix II, which requires member states to ensure the conservation of the listed taxa and their habitats. Under this convention, protections of Appendix-II species include the prohibition of:

- deliberate capture, keeping and killing of the species;
- deliberate damage or destruction of breeding sites;
- deliberate disturbance during the breeding season;
- deliberate taking or destruction of eggs;
- the possession or trade of any individual of the species.

It is difficult to assess the effectiveness of this designation in preventing further loss of Cantabrian capercaillie or its habitat. However, the EU Habitats Directive is a response to the Bern Convention. The Habitats Directive (92/43/EEC) addresses the protection of habitat and species listed as endangered at the European scale (European Union 2008). Several habitat types valuable to capercaillie have been included in this Directive, such as in Appendix I, Section 9, Forests.

The EU Birds Directive lists the capercaillie as an Annex 1 species, "subject to special habitat conservation measures in order to ensure their survival." Under this Directive, a network of Special Protection Areas (SPAs) comprising suitable habitat for Annex I species is to be designated. This network of SPAs and other protected sites are collectively referred to as Natura 2000. As an EU member state, Spain has designated SPAs. The remaining Cantabrian capercaillie populations occur primarily in protected areas in Spain that are part of the Natura 2000 network (for example, Muniellos nature reserve). Management of natural resources by local communities is still allowed in areas designated as an SPA; however, the development of management plans to meet the various objectives of the Reserve network is required.

In November 2003, Spain enacted the Forest Law, which addresses the preservation and improvement of the forest and rangelands in Spain. This law requires development of plans for the management of forest resources, which are to include plans for fighting forest fires, establishment of danger zones based on fire risk, formulation of a defense plan in each established danger zone, the mandatory restoration of burned area, and the prohibition of changing forest use of a burned area into other uses for a period of 30 years. In addition, this law provides economic incentives for sustainable forest management by private landowners and local entities.

Despite recent advances in protection of this subspecies and its habitat through EU Directives and protection under Spanish law and regulation, illegal poaching still occurs (Storch 2000, p. 83; 2007, p. 96).

==== Other threats ====
Suarez-Seoane and Roves (2004) assessed the potential impacts of human disturbances in core populations of Cantabrian capercaillie in Natural Reserves in Spain. They found that locations selected as leks were located at the core of larger patches of forest and were less subject to human disturbance. They also found that Cantabrian capercaillie disappeared from leks situated in rolling hills at lower altitudes closer to houses, hunting sites, and repeatedly burned areas. Recurring fires have also been implicated as a factor in the decline of the subspecies. An average of 85,652 hectares (211,650 acres) of forested area per year over a 10–year period (1995–2005) has been consumed by fire in Spain. On average, 80 percent of all fires in Spain are set intentionally by humans. Suarez-Seoane and Garcia-Roves (2004) found that the stability of Cantabrian capercaillie breeding areas throughout a 20–year period was mainly related to low fire recurrence in the surrounding area and few houses nearby. In addition, the species avoids areas that are recurrently burned because the areas lose their ability to regenerate and cannot produce the habitat the species requires.

== See also ==
- Europa Environment. (2009). Europa Environment: The Birds Directive. Downloaded from http://ec.europa.eu/environment/nature/legislation/birdsdirective/index_en.htm on 12/26/2009
- European Union, Council Decision 82/72/EEC of 3 December 1981 concerning the conclusion of the convention on the conservation of European wildlife and natural habitats (Bern Convention). From the activities of the European Union. Downloaded from http://europa.eu/scadplus/leg/en/lvb/128050.htm 1/11/2008.
- European Union, Council Directive 92/43/EEC of 21 May 1992 on the conservation of natural habitats and of wild fauna and flora. From the activities of the European Union. Downloaded from http://europa.eu/scadplus/leg/en/lvb/128076.htm on 1/11/08
- European Union, Council Directive 79/409/EEC of 2 April 1979 on the conservation of wild birds. From the activities of the European Union. Downloaded on 1/11/08 from http://europa.eu/scadplus/leg/en/lvb/128046.htm
- Hirschfeld, E. (2007). Rare Bird Yearbook 2008: The World's most Threatened Birds. MagDig Media. p. 139.
- International Union for Conservation of Nature and Natural Resources (IUCN). (1979). Cantabrian capercaillie (Tetrao urogallus cantabricus). Compiled by W.B. King on behalf of the International Council for Bird Preservation and the Survival Service Commission of IUCN, 1110 Morges, Switzerland.
- Lacy, R.C. (2000). Considering threats to the viability of small populations using individual-based models. Ecological Bulletins 48: 39–51.
- Martinez, A. (1993). Contribución al conocimiento de la ecoetología del Urogallo cantábrico (Tetrao urogallus cantabricus). León University, Spain.
- Ministry of Environment of Spain. (2005). Orden MAM/2231/2005, de 27 de junio, por la que se incluyen en el Catálogo Nacional de Especies Amenazadas las especies Astragalus nitidiflorus y el Lagarto gigante de La Gomera y cambian de categoría el Urogallo cantábrico y el Visón europeo. (BOE nº 165, de 12 de julio de 2005).
- Owens, P.F. and P.M. Bennett. (2000). Ecological basis of extinction risk in birds: Habitat loss versus human persecution and introduced predators. Proceedings of the National Academy of Sciences 97: 12144–12148.
- Pollo, C.J. (2001). El Urogallo cantábrico: situación actual y actuaciones de futuro. Medio Ambiente en Castilla y León, 16: 14–26.
- Storch, I. (2007). Grouse: Status Survey and conservation Action Plan 2006–2010. IUCN, Gland, Switzerland and Cambridge UK and World Pheasant Association, Fordingbridge, UK, 124 p.
- Vandermeer and Carvajal. (2001). Metapopulation Dynamics and the Quality of the Matrix. The American Naturalist 158 (3):211–220.
- Wildlife Conservation Society. (2007). Commune Natural Resource Management Profile. Downloaded from:http://www.wcs.org.

== Sources ==
- Website devoted to Cantabrian capercaillie, an endangered population of Tetrao urogallus
- Publications on Cantabrian capercaillie
- Website with information on Cantabrian capercaillie mainly in Castilla and Leon region
