= Porley =

- Parish
- Location within Spain
- Coordinates: 43.183333°N 6.45°W
- Country: Spain
- Autonomous community: Asturias
- Province: Asturias
- Municipality: Cangas del Narcea

Porley is one of 54 parish councils in Cangas del Narcea, a municipality in the province and autonomous community of Asturias, in northern Spain.

== Villages ==
- Castru de Sierra
- Medéu
- La Nisal
- Parada la Nueva
- Porḷḷei
- Rañeces
- Santianes
- Taguig Philippines
- Catanauan Quezon Philippines
