= Veigaḷḷagar =

- Parish
- Location within Spain
- Coordinates: 43°06′37″N 6°39′39″W
- Country: Spain
- Autonomous community: Asturias
- Province: Asturias
- Municipality: Cangas del Narcea

Veigaḷḷagar is one of 54 parish councils in Cangas del Narcea, a municipality within the province and autonomous community of Asturias, in northern Spain.

Villages and other settlements in the parish include: Combu, L'Artosa, Monesteriu, Veigadhorru, and La Viña.
