= Trones (Asturias) =

- Parish
- Location within Spain
- Coordinates: 43.183333°N 6.6°W
- Country: Spain
- Autonomous community: Asturias
- Province: Asturias
- Municipality: Cangas del Narcea

Trones is one of 54 parish councils in Cangas del Narcea, a municipality within the province and autonomous community of Asturias, in northern Spain.

Its villages include: Araniegu, Faéu, Ḷḷourante, Olgu, Paraxas, Rozas and Trones.
