= Cangas del Narcea (parish) =

- Parish
- Location within Spain
- Coordinates: 43.183333°N 6.55°W
- Country: Spain
- Autonomous community: Asturias
- Province: Asturias
- Municipality: Cangas del Narcea

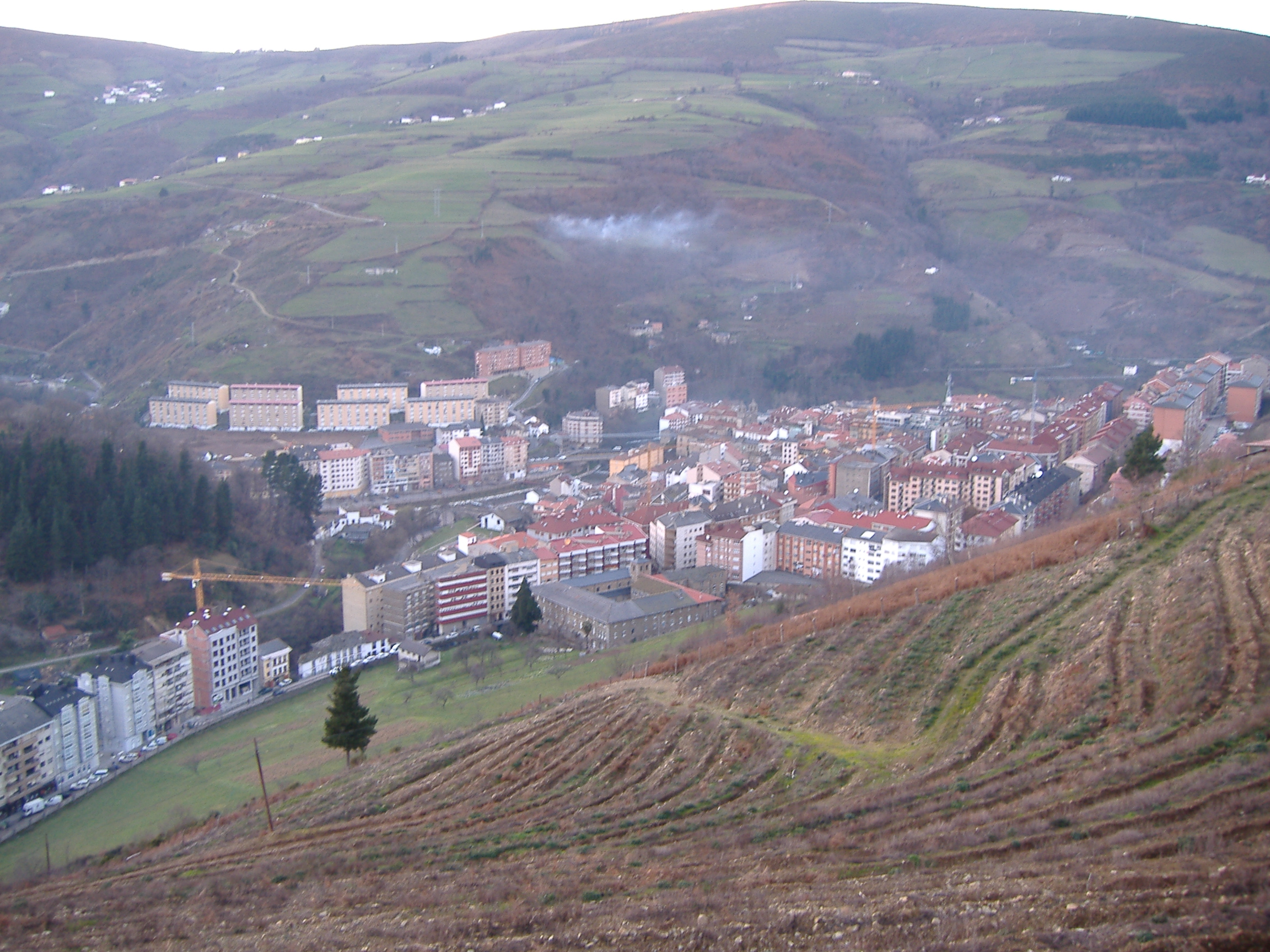
Cangas del Narcea

Cangas del Narcea is one of 54 parishes in Cangas del Narcea, a municipality within the province and autonomous community of Asturias, in northern Spain. The town of Cangas del Narcea is the capital of the council of the same name.

It is located in the north-central area of the council.

== Localities ==
According to the nomenclature of 201312 the parish is formed by the towns of:

Cangas del Narcea (village): 6,592 inhabitants.

Curriellos (hamlet): 39 inhabitants.

Llamas de Ambasaguas (officially, in Asturian, Llamas)4 (hamlet): 26 inhabitants.

El Pinar (neighborhood): 2 inhabitants.

Las Carballidas (place): 2 inhabitants.

La Cogolla (place): 9 inhabitants.

La Cortinona (place): 4 inhabitants.

San Tirso (San Tisu) (place): 24 inhabitants.

Sienra (place): 55 inhabitants.
