= Viḷḷalái =

- Parish
- Location within Spain
- Coordinates: 43°07′46″N 6°30′14″W
- Country: Spain
- Autonomous community: Asturias
- Province: Asturias
- Municipality: Cangas del Narcea

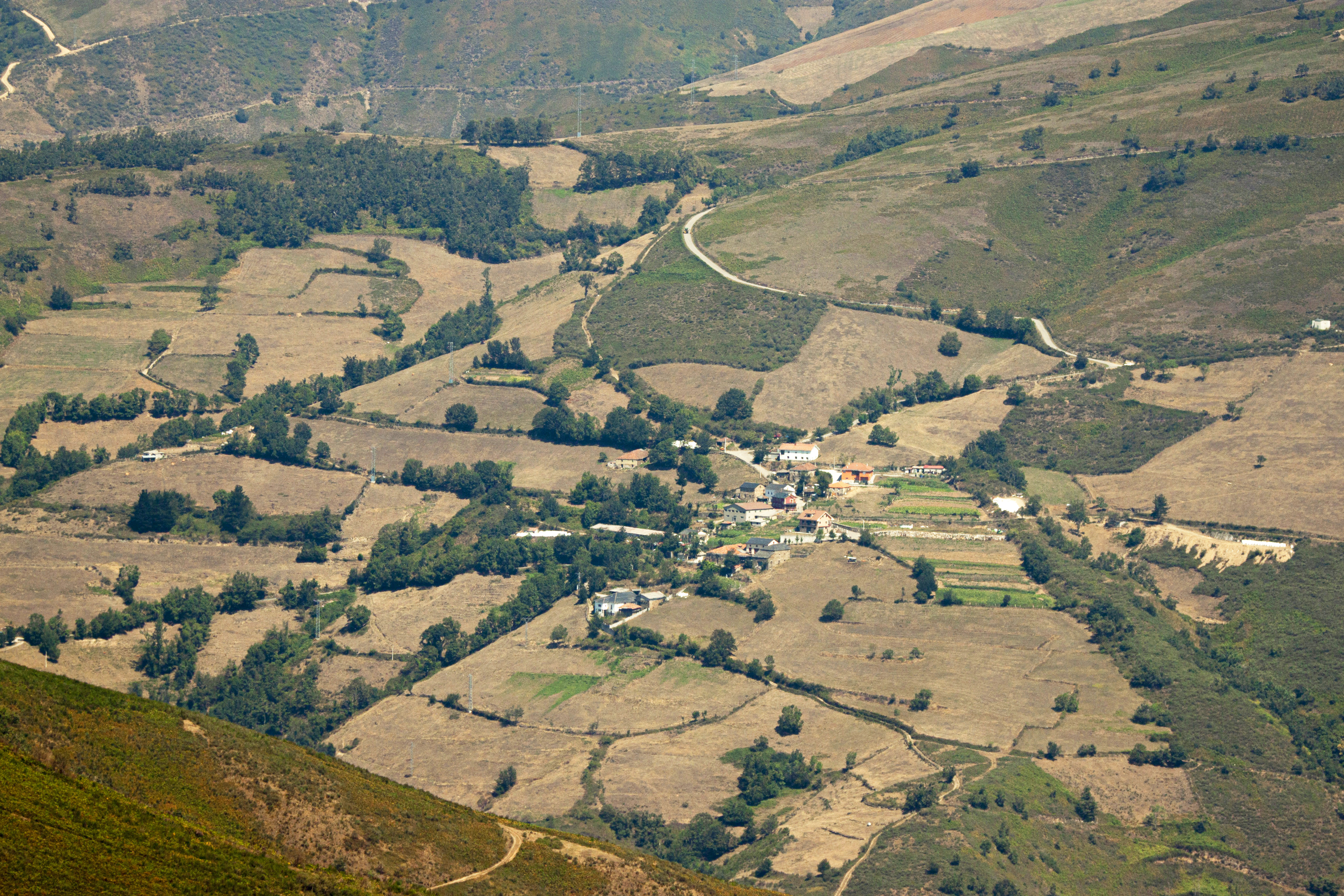
Viḷḷalái (Cangas del Narcea, Asturias)

Viḷḷalái (Asturian pronunciation: [bɪt͡ɕaˈlai̯]) is one of 54 parishes (administrative divisions) in Cangas del Narcea, a municipality within the province and autonomous community of Asturias, in northern Spain.

== Villages ==
- Coubos
- Las Cuadrieḷḷas de Viḷḷalái
- Viḷḷalái

=== Other places ===
- La Casa la Benita
- La Casa las Mestas
- La Casilla
- Las Mestas
- La Venta la Perra
