= Cueras =

- Parish
- Location within Spain
- Coordinates: 43.166667°N 6.55°W
- Country: Spain
- Autonomous community: Asturias
- Province: Asturias
- Municipality: Cangas del Narcea

Cueras (or Santa Eulalia de Cueras) is one of 54 parishes in Cangas del Narcea, a municipality within the province and autonomous community of Asturias, in northern Spain.

== Villages ==
- Arayón
- Cueiras
- El Ḷḷanu
- Santolaya
- Santuyanu
