= San Xulianu =

- Parish
- Location within Spain
- Coordinates: 43.500°N 6.867°W
- Country: Spain
- Autonomous community: Asturias
- Province: Asturias
- Municipality: Cangas del Narcea

San Xulianu is one of 54 parish councils in Cangas del Narcea, a municipality within the province and autonomous community of Asturias, in northern Spain.

Its villages include: Arbas, La Chabola, Corros, La Fonda, Xilán, Ḷḷindouta, Miravaḷḷes, Tardexugu, L'Outeiru, Rimolín, San Xulianu, San Romanu d'Arbas, Veigairrei, Veigaimiedru, Viḷḷaxer and Viḷḷar de Rogueiru.
