= Noseda =

Noseda is a surname. Notable people with the surname include:

- Arianna Noseda (born 1997), Italian rower
- Gianandrea Noseda (born 1964), Italian conductor
- Jeremy Noseda (born 1963), British racehorse trainer
- Sergio Noja Noseda (1931–2008), Italian professor

== See also ==
- Noceda (disambiguation)
