= Adralés =

- Parish
- Location within Spain
- Coordinates: 43°10′0″N 6°34′0″W
- Country: Spain
- Autonomous community: Asturias
- Province: Asturias
- Municipality: Cangas del Narcea

Adralés is one of 54 parishes in Cangas del Narcea, a municipality within the province and autonomous community of Asturias, in northern Spain. The parish consists of three villages: Adralés, Villar de Adralés and El Altu Santarvás. The village of Adralés is three kilometres southeast of the capital of Cangas del Narcea.

The economy of Adralés has always been based primarily on cattle farming. Due to the village's proximity to the town of Cangas del Narcea, farmers from Adralés have always been present at its markets and were even able to supply it with milk, whereas most villages of the municipality only raised cattle for their meat as they were unable to transport or preserve milk. At present most inhabitants of Adralés are retired farmers or young people who work in Cangas.

In previous centuries many people emigrated to Cuba and the Philippines from this area. In fact, "Adrales" is a common surname in the Philippines, originating from this Asturian province.

Throughout the 19th century and continuing until the 1970s, Adralés lost most of its population to emigration. Most emigrants made their way to Madrid as night watchmen. A considerable number emigrated to Argentina and Venezuela, while in the 1960s and 1970s almost every household in the village had sent one of its members to Switzerland.

== Notable people ==
- José Calvo Martínez, secretary general of the Unión de Campesinos Asturianos (Union of Asturian Farmworkers) since 1995
- Aurelio Ordás Rodríguez (1942- ), founder and three-time president of the Asturian Centre in Basel, Switzerland and local director of the Spanish Socialist Workers' Party in Basel. Emigrated to France in 1961 and later to Switzerland. He was also the director of other Spanish immigrant associations in Switzerland.
- Daniel Ordás Menéndez (1974- ), son of Aurelio Ordás Rodríguez, lawyer and secretary general of the SSWP in Switzerland from 2001 to 2004; ex-member of the Executive Commission of the Federation of the SSWP in Europe; member of the Federal Committee of the SSWP; founder and president of the Association of Spanish Employers and Freelancers in Switzerland.
