= Ḷḷarón =

- Parish
- Location within Spain
- Coordinates: 42.983333°N 6.633333°W
- Country: Spain
- Autonomous community: Asturias
- Province: Asturias
- Municipality: Cangas del Narcea

Ḷḷarón (Spanish: Larón)is one of 54 parish councils in Cangas del Narcea, a municipality within the province and autonomous community of Asturias, in northern Spain.

== Villages ==
- Ḷḷarón
- La Vilieḷḷa
