= Viḷḷatexil =

- Parish
- Location within Spain
- Coordinates: 43°07′19″N 6°32′06″W
- Country: Spain
- Autonomous community: Asturias
- Province: Asturias
- Municipality: Cangas del Narcea

Viḷḷatexil is one of 54 parishes (administrative divisions) in Cangas del Narcea, a municipality within the province and autonomous community of Asturias, in northern Spain.

== Towns ==
- Las Mestas
- Morzóu
- Viḷḷatexil

=== Other places ===
- El Barriu
- Las Rapegueras
- El Reboḷḷu
