= Viḷḷacibrán =

- Parish
- Location within Spain
- Coordinates: 43.066667°N 6.516667°W
- Country: Spain
- Autonomous community: Asturias
- Province: Asturias
- Municipality: Cangas del Narcea

Viḷḷacibrán is one of 54 parish councils in Cangas del Narcea, a municipality within the province and autonomous community of Asturias, in northern Spain.

Villages and other settlements in the parish include: Tabláu, Vil.lacibrán, Las Barrosinas, La Casa la Escuela, La Casa las Penas, El Picón, Saldepuestu, Santa L.locaya, La Venta l'Aire, and Las Ventas.
