= Cibea =

- Parish
- Location within Spain
- Coordinates: 43°04′03″N 6°27′05″W
- Country: Spain
- Autonomous community: Asturias
- Province: Asturias
- Municipality: Cangas del Narcea

Cibea is one of 54 parishes in Cangas del Narcea, a municipality within the province and autonomous community of Asturias, in northern Spain.

== Villages ==
- L'Abechera
- Ḷḷamera
- La Riela de Cibea
- La Reguera'l Cabu
- Sigueiru
- Sonande
- Surrodiles
- Vaḷḷáu
- Viḷḷar de los Indianos
- Viḷḷeirín

=== Other settlements ===
- L'Arenal
- El L.lobornal
- La Poza
- El Téranu
- La Vecera
