= Berguñu =

- Parish
- Location within Spain
- Coordinates: 43.116667°N 6.566667°W
- Country: Spain
- Autonomous community: Asturias
- Province: Asturias
- Municipality: Cangas del Narcea

Berguñu is one of 54 parishes in Cangas del Narcea, a municipality within the province and autonomous community of Asturias, in northern Spain.

== Villages ==
- Berguñu
- Combarru
- El Pládanu
