= Fontes de Corveiru =

- Parish
- Location within Spain
- Coordinates: 43.1°N 6.45°W
- Country: Spain
- Autonomous community: Asturias
- Province: Asturias
- Municipality: Cangas del Narcea

Fontes de Corveiru (Spanish: Fuentes de Corbero) is one of 54 parishes in Cangas del Narcea, a municipality within the province and autonomous community of Asturias, in northern Spain.

== Villages ==
- Fontes de Corveiru
- Valmayor
