= Gillón =

- Parish
- Location within Spain
- Coordinates: 43.016667°N 6.55°W
- Country: Spain
- Autonomous community: Asturias
- Province: Asturias
- Municipality: Cangas del Narcea

Gillón (or Xichón) is one of 54 parish councils in Cangas del Narcea, a municipality within the province and autonomous community of Asturias, in northern Spain. It consists of four settlements: El Cotu, Xichón / Gillón, Vidal, and La Feltrosa.

The population is 78 (2007).
