= Bimeda =

- Parish
- Location within Spain
- Coordinates: 43.1°N 6.533333°W
- Country: Spain
- Autonomous community: Asturias
- Province: Asturias
- Municipality: Cangas del Narcea

Bimeda is one of 54 parishes in Cangas del Narcea, a municipality within the province and autonomous community of Asturias, in northern Spain.

== Villages ==
- Bimeda
- Bustieḷḷu
- Ḷḷavachos
- Murias
- La Pena Samartino
- San Xuan del Monte
- Samartinu de Bimeda
- El Vaḷḷe
- Viḷḷauril de Bimeda
- Viḷḷar de Bimeda
