= Noceda de Rengos =

- Parish
- Location within Spain
- Coordinates: 43.05°N 6.583333°W
- Country: Spain
- Autonomous community: Asturias
- Province: Asturias
- Municipality: Cangas del Narcea

Noceda de Rengos is one of 54 parish councils in Cangas del Narcea, a municipality within the province and autonomous community of Asturias, in northern Spain.

== Villages ==
- Cuitada
- Noceda
- Reitornu
- Tresmonte d'Abaxu
- Tresmonte d'Arriba
