= Mycoplasma agalactiae =

Scientific classification
- Domain: Bacteria
- Kingdom: Bacillati
- Phylum: Mycoplasmatota
- Class: Mollicutes
- Order: Mycoplasmatales
- Family: Mycoplasmataceae
- Genus: Mycoplasma
- Species: M. agalactiae

Binomial name
- Mycoplasma agalactiae (Wroblewski 1931) Freundt 1955

Synonyms
- Microbe de l'agalaxie contagieuse" Bridré and Donatien 1923 *"Anulomyces agalaxiae" (sic) Wroblewski 1931 *"Borrelomyces agalactiae" (Wroblewski 1931) Turner 1935 *"Capromyces agalactiae" (Wroblewski 1931) Sabin 1941 *"Pleuropneumonia agalactiae" (Wroblewski 1931) Tulasne and Brisou 1955 *"Asterococcus agalactiae" (Wroblewski 1931) Prévot 1961.

Species of bacterium

Mycoplasma agalactiae is a species of bacteria in the genus Mycoplasma. This genus of bacteria lacks a cell wall around their cell membrane. Without a cell wall, they are unaffected by many common antibiotics such as penicillin or other beta-lactam antibiotics that target cell wall synthesis. Mycoplasma are the smallest bacterial cells yet discovered, can survive without oxygen and are typically about 0.1–0.3 μm in diameter.

It is the main agent of contagious agalactia, a syndrome causing clinical signs of mastitis, conjunctivitis, and arthritis in small ruminants. It can be present in their milk. At least eleven strains of this species have been characterized. In serious outbreaks with infections with this pathogen, whole herds have been lost.

The type strain is strain PG2 = CIP 59.7 = NCTC 10123.

== See also ==
- Veterinary pathology
- Mastitis
