= Entreviñas (Narcea) =

- Parish
- Location within Spain
- Coordinates: 43.566667°N 5.933333°W
- Country: Spain
- Autonomous community: Asturias
- Province: Asturias
- Municipality: Cangas del Narcea

Entreviñas (variant: San Cristóbal de Entreviñas) is one of 54 parishes in Cangas del Narcea, a municipality within the province and autonomous community of Asturias in northern Spain.

== Villages ==
- Borracán
- La Braña San Cristuébalu
- Las Esculinas
- Rañeces de San Cristuébalu
- Robléu de San Cristuébalu
- Rucabu
- Veigalapiedra
- Briximada
- Viḷḷanueva

=== Other settlements ===
- Casa'l Chapas
- Casa'i Farrucu
