= Steven M. Gillon =

US historian, academic, and television presenter

Steven M. Gillon (born December 11,1956) is an American historian. He is the Scholar-in-Residence at The History Channel, Professor of History at the University of Oklahoma, and Senior Faculty Fellow at the Miller Center for the Study of the Presidency at the University of Virginia.

== Education ==
Gillon received his B.A. in History from Widener University where he graduated summa cum laude with honors in History. He was named the recipient of the Faculty Prize for maintaining the highest undergraduate GPA. He went on to earn his A.M. and Ph.D. in American Civilization from Brown University where he was elected to Phi Beta Kappa.

== Career ==
After receiving his Ph.D., Gillon spent nine years teaching history at Yale University where he won the prestigious DeVane Medal for outstanding undergraduate teaching. In 1994, he accepted a position as University Lecturer in Modern History at Oxford University. Three years later, he returned to the United States at the invitation of the president of the University of Oklahoma to become the founding dean of a new Honors College.

Gillon is one of the nation's leading experts on modern American history and politics. He has written or edited nearly a dozen books including the New York Times bestsellers, The Pact: Bill Clinton, Newt Gingrich and the Rivalry that Defined a Generation (Oxford, 2008) and America’s Reluctant Prince: The Life of John F. Kennedy Jr. (2019)

Among his many other books are: Separate and Unequal: The Kerner Commission and the Unraveling of American Liberalism (Basic, 2018); Pearl Harbor: FDR Leads the Nation into War (Basic 2011); 10 Days that Unexpectedly Changed America (Three Rivers 2006); Boomer Nation: The Largest and Richest Generation and How it Changed America (Free Press 2004); That’s Not What We Meant to Do: Reform and Its Unintended Consequences in Twentieth-Century America (W.W. Norton, 2000); The Democrats' Dilemma: Walter F. Mondale and the Liberal Legacy,(Columbia University, 1992); and Politics and Vision: The ADA and American Liberalism, 1947-1985, (Oxford 1987).

His articles have appeared in both academic journals and popular newspapers, including the Los Angeles Times, New York Daily News, Washington Post, Chicago Tribune, and Boston Globe. He has been a frequent contributor to the Huffington Post. He has made appearances on NBC’s Today Show, ABC’s Good Morning America, CNN, MSNBC, and Fox News as a commentator and expert on issues related to modern American history.

Over the past decade, Gillon has hosted a number of shows on HISTORY, including the network's flagship public affairs program, HistoryCenter (1998-2009). He has also hosted Our Generation, History vs. Hollywood, and Movies in Time. He was the main narrator and executive producer for a number of History and A&E documentary specials, including Boomer Nation, The Kennedy Assassination: 24 Hours After, Pearl Harbor: 24 Hours After, and JFK Jr. The Final Year. He also served as the chief consultant on History’s eight-hour series, The Presidents.

== Notable works ==
- Politics and Vision: The ADA and American Liberalism, 1947–1985 (1987) ISBN 9780195049732
- The Democrats' Dilemma (1992) ISBN 9780231076302
- That's Not What We Meant to Do: Reform and Its Unintended Consequences in the Twentieth Century (2000) ISBN 9780393048841
- The American Experiment: A History of the United States (2001) ISBN 9780395677513
- The American Paradox: A History of the United States Since 1960 (2002) ISBN 9780618150175
- Boomer Nation: The Largest and Richest Generation Ever, and How It Changed America (2004) ISBN 9780743229470
- 10 Days That Unexpectedly Changed America (2006) ISBN 9780307339348
- The American Paradox: A History of the United States Since 1945 (2006) ISBN 9780618660865
- The Pact: Bill Clinton, Newt Gingrich, and the Rivalry that Defined a Generation (2008) ISBN 9780195322781
- The Kennedy Assassination—24 Hours After: Lyndon B. Johnson's Pivotal First Day as President (2010) ISBN 9780465018703
- Pearl Harbor: FDR Leads the Nation to War (2011) ISBN 9786613788085
- Separate and Unequal: The Kerner Commission and the Unraveling of American Liberalism (2018) ISBN 9780465096084
- America's Reluctant Prince: The Life of John F. Kennedy Jr. (2019) ISBN 9781524742386
- Presidents at War: How World War II Shaped a Generation of Presidents, from Eisenhower and JFK through Reagan and Bush (2025) ISBN 9780593183144
