= Ern Gillon =

Australian rugby league footballer

Personal information
- Full name: Ernie Gillon
- Born: Parramatta, New South Wales, Australia

Playing information
- Position: Centre
Club
Years	Team	Pld	T	G	FG	P
1966	Parramatta	17	0	0	0	0
1967–70	Penrith	63	4	0	0	12
	Total	80	4	0	0	12

Ernie Gillon is an Australian former professional rugby league footballer who played as a centre for Parramatta and Penrith in the 1960s and 1970s. Gillon was a foundation player for Penrith and played in the club's first ever game.

== Playing career ==
Gillon played in the 1964 third grade team that won Parra's first ever premiership. He made his first grade debut for Parramatta in 1966 and played 16 times for the club in his only season there. In 1967, Gillon made the switch to newly admitted side Penrith and played in the club's first ever game which was a 15–12 defeat against Canterbury. Gillon played with Penrith for the next 3 seasons as the club struggled near the bottom of the ladder narrowly avoiding the wooden spoon. Gillon later played for Ryde - Eastwood, winning the 2nd Division title in 1972.
