= Zoetis =

American animal health company

Zoetis Inc.
- Type: Public
- Traded as: NYSE: ZTS (Class A); S&P 500 component
- Industry: Pharmaceutical
- Founded: 1952; 74 years ago
- Headquarters: Parsippany, New Jersey, U.S.
- Area served: Worldwide
- Key people: Kristin Peck (CEO); Michael McCallister (chair); Ester Banque (EVP)
- Revenue: ▲US$9.47 billion (2025)
- Net income: ▲US$2.67 billion (2025)
- Total assets: ▲US$15.467 billion (2025)
- Total equity: ▲US$3.331 billion (2025)
- Number of employees: 14,500 (2025)
- Website: zoetis.com

Zoetis Inc. (/zoʊˈɛtɪs/), headquartered in Parsippany, New Jersey, is the largest producer of medicine and vaccinations for pets and livestock worldwide. The company's products include antiparasitics, vaccines, products that relieve itch, anti-infectives, products that alleviate pain, animal health diagnostics, as well as hormones, cardiopulmonary, topical and oral hygiene therapeutics, central nervous system drugs, diuretics, antiemetic, euthanasia, and hepato-digestive products. The company has operations in over 50 countries.

In 2025, 70% of the company's revenue came from products for pets and 29% of the company's revenues came from products for livestock. In 2025, 54% of the company's revenue came from customers in the United States. Of this revenue, 79% came from products for dogs and cats, 13% came from products for cattle, and 4% came from products for horses. In 2025, 46% of the company's revenue came from international customers. Of this revenue, 53% came from products for dogs and cats, 19% came from products for cattle, 9% came from products for swine, 7% came from products for poultry, and 3% came from products for horses.

The firm is named Zoetis in allusion to the Greek-derived zoological term zoetic, meaning "pertaining to life". The company was owned by Pfizer until 2013.

== History ==
=== 1950s to 2000s ===
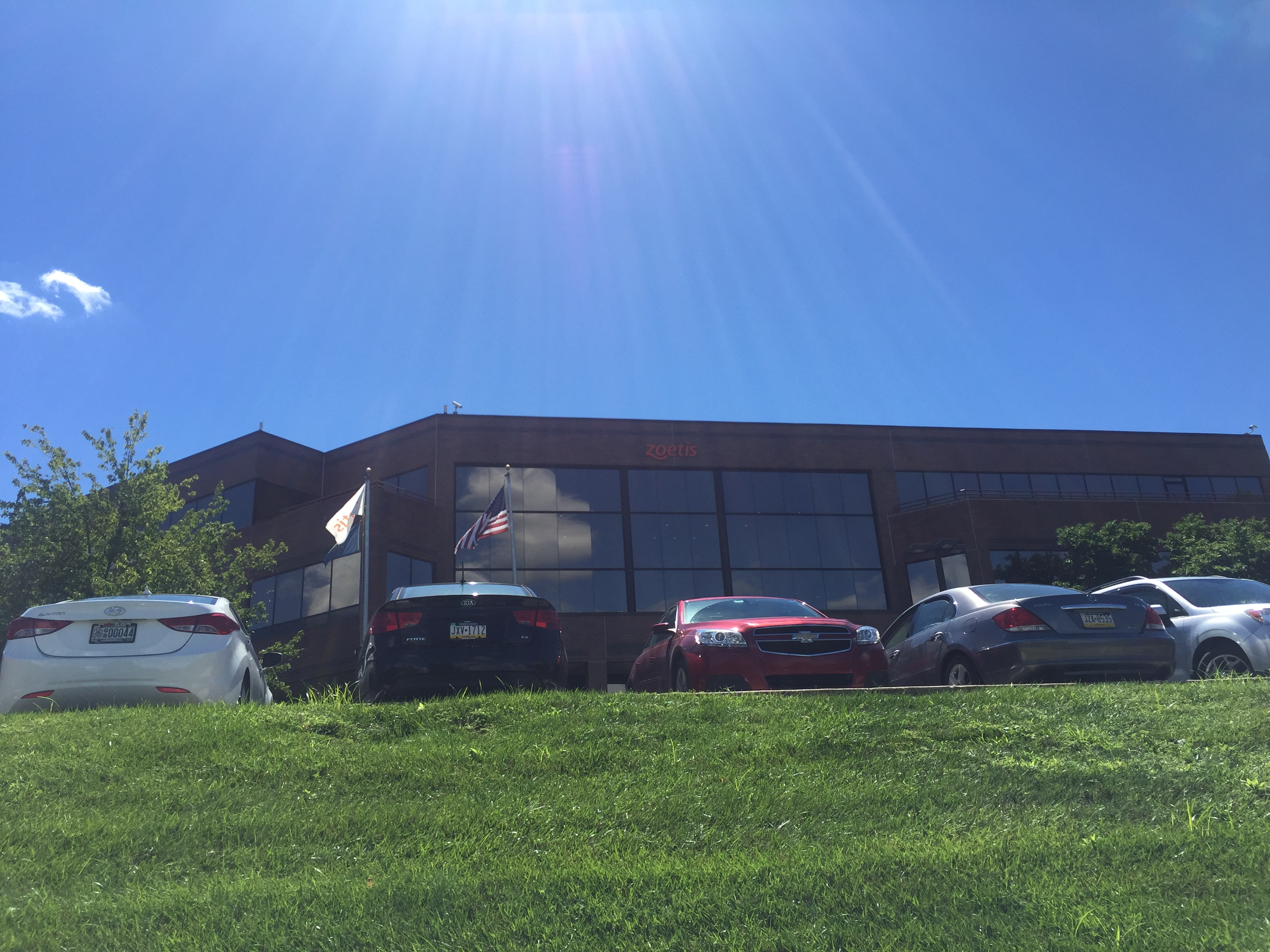
Zoetis building in Exton, PA

In the 1950s, Pfizer began research on several drugs, including oxytetracycline, which was found to be effective in livestock.

In 1952, the Pfizer Agriculture Division opened a 732-acre research and development facility in Terre Haute, Indiana, called Vigo.

In 1988, the division was renamed Pfizer Animal Health.

In 1995, Pfizer acquired Norden Laboratories from GlaxoSmithKline for $1.45 billion, expanding its animal health division into small animal care, including pets.

Secondary research and development centres were opened in Kalamazoo, Michigan, in 2003.

In April 2003, Pfizer acquired Pharmacia Corporation for $60 billion in stock. Pfizer absorbed its animal health assets, which included the legacy operations of The Upjohn Company, into Pfizer Animal Health.

In December 2006, Pfizer Animal Health acquired Embrex, which provides inoculations for poultry against various diseases, for $155 million.

In March 2008, Pfizer Animal Health acquired Catapult Genetics, a developer of livestock DNA tests and gene markers, and Bovigen, which markets DNA technology.

In April 2008, Pfizer Animal Health acquired vaccine products from Schering-Plough.

In June 2009, Pfizer Animal Health acquired Vetnex Animal Health from ICICI Bank.

In October 2009, Pfizer acquired Wyeth, including its subsidiary Fort Dodge Animal Health, which was added to Pfizer Animal Health. Some assets were sold to Boehringer Ingelheim to gain regulatory approval for the transaction.

In May 2010, Pfizer Animal Health acquired Microtek, a developer of aquaculture vaccines.

=== 2010s-present ===
In January 2011, Pfizer Animal Health acquired Synbiotics, a developer of immunodiagnostic tests for companion and food production animals, for $20 million.

In February 2011, Pfizer acquired King Pharmaceuticals; its Alpharma subsidiary was integrated into Pfizer Animal Health.

In June 2012, Pfizer Animal Health was renamed Zoetis.

In February 2013, Zoetis became a public company via an initial public offering, raising $2.2 billion. Most of the money raised through the IPO was used to pay off existing Pfizer debt. In June 2013, Pfizer divested itself of its remaining shares in Zoetis.

In February 2015, the company acquired a portfolio of pet drugs from Abbott Laboratories for approximately $255 million.

In July 2015, the company acquired KL Automation, a robotics company specializing in automation technology for poultry hatchery.

In November 2015, the company announced it would acquire Pharmaq, a developer of aquaculture treatments and diseases, for $765 million.

In August 2016, the company acquired Scandinavian Micro Biodevices for $80 million.

In April 2017, Zoetis acquired Ireland-based Nexvet, a company with a biologics focused technology and product candidate pipeline.

In July 2018, the company acquired Abaxis for $1.9 billion in cash.

In June 2022, Zoetis acquired Basepaws, a privately held genetics company.

In August 2022, the company acquired Newmetrica, a Scottish company that develops digital tools designed to measure health-related quality of life.

In September 2022, Zoetis acquired Jurox, which develops 150 medicines including Alfaxan.

In August 2023, the company opened a 1.4 million square foot facility on 145 acres in Lincoln, Nebraska.

In September 2023, Zoetis acquired Petmedix, a privately held Cambridge, UK-based company, to bring the benefits of species-specific antibody therapies to pet owners.

In December 2023, Zoetis acquired adivo, a German manufacturer of antibodies for pet medicine.

In October 2024, the company sold its medicated feed additive product portfolio and certain water-soluble products to Phibro Animal Health.

In February 2025, the United States Department of Agriculture granted Zoetis conditional approval to deploy its bird flu vaccine in poultry, after a bird flu outbreak had infected nearly 70 people in the US, resulting in one death, with most cases occurring among farm workers exposed to infected poultry or cattle. In January 2025, the USDA announced plans to replenish its bird flu vaccine stockpile for poultry, aligning with the strain affecting commercial and wild bird populations, similar to efforts following major outbreaks in 2014 and 2015.

In November 2025, the company acquired Veterinary Pathology Group.

In March 2026, the company agreed to acquired the genomics business of Neogen.

In July 2026, the company agreed to acquire VitalRADS, a veterinary teleradiology platform.

== Products ==
Zoetis' manufacturing network, includes 28 sites in 11 countries. Each facility is designed to meet chemical and infectious agent safety regulatory requirements. Many R&D operations are co-located with manufacturing sites, a collaboration that allows bringing new products to market faster.

Zoetis products include:

- BoviShield FP
- Cytopoint
- Cerenia
- Convenia
- Dectomax
- Draxxin
- Excede
- Excenel
- Histostat
- Mycitracin
- Palladia
- Pirsue
- A180
- Revolution Pet Medicine
- Rimadyl
- Sileo
- Simplicef
- Slentrol
- Stronghold
- Synulox
- Vanguard vaccines
