= Ambres (Narcea) =

- Parish
- Location within Spain
- Coordinates: 43.16667°N 6.416667°W
- Country: Spain
- Autonomous community: Asturias
- Province: Asturias
- Municipality: Cangas del Narcea

Ambres is one of 54 parishes in Cangas del Narcea, a municipality within the province and autonomous community of Asturias, in northern Spain.

== Villages ==
Ambres is a populated place and its villages include: Ambres, Las Cuadrieḷḷas d'Ambres, Las Defradas d'Ambres, Ridera, and La Casa la Campa.
