= La Riela =

- Parish
- Location within Spain
- Coordinates: 43.15°N 6.583333°W
- Country: Spain
- Autonomous community: Asturias
- Province: Asturias
- Municipality: Cangas del Narcea

La Riela is one of 54 parish councils in Cangas del Narcea, a municipality within the province and autonomous community of Asturias, in northern Spain.

The parish's villages include: Aciu, Caldeviḷḷa d'Aciu, Pinḷḷés, Parandones, Perdieḷḷu, Reboḷḷas, La Riela, Sebil, Veigaipope, Veiga, La Veiga de Pinḷḷés and Yema. Other settlements include: L'Arnosa, La Carretera, Las Casas de la Viña la Veiga, El Cascarín, La Casilla, El Cutrión, El Ganzalón, Los Peneirinos, La Plaza, Sante, and El Santu.
