= Muniellos Nature Reserve =

Protected area of woodland in Asturias, Spain

- Reserva natural integral de Muniellos
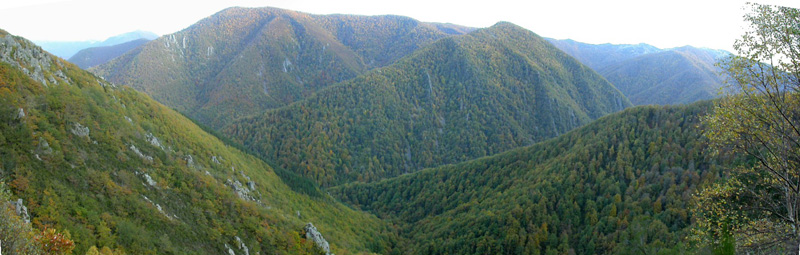

- Location within Spain
- Location: Asturias, Spain
- Coordinates: 43°01′16″N 6°42′07″W
- Area: 5,488 ha (13,560 acres)
- Visitors: 20 per day

The Muniellos Nature Reserve (Spanish: Reserva natural integral de Muniellos) is a protected area of woodland in Asturias, Spain. The area of the nature reserve is 5,488 ha (13,560 acres). The main species of tree is oak: it has been described as probably the best preserved Quercus robur forest in Spain.

== History ==
In the 1970s timber extraction was forbidden and the woods were preserved as a hunting reserve. Hunting has since also been banned. Human access to the nature reserve itself is now strictly controlled, although there is a visitor centre overlooking it.

=== Biosphere reserve ===
In 2000 UNESCO designated Muniellos as a biosphere reserve. The area of the biosphere reserve was extended in 2003 to take account of the creation of the Natural Park of Fuentes del Narcea, Degaña e Ibias, which incorporates Muniellos. The core area of the Muniellos biosphere reserve occupies 8,661 ha (21,400 acres), making it somewhat larger than the nature reserve. The rest of the natural park is classed as a buffer zone to the core area.

As at 2011 there has been discussion of how the various biosphere reserves in the Cantabrian Mountains could be managed as a single super-reserve to be known as Gran Cantábrica. The first phase of integration would include Somiedo Natural Park. Other relevant reserves include Redes Natural Park, which is also in Asturias.

=== Wildlife ===
Wildlife includes brown bears (Cantabrian brown bear) and capercaillies (Cantabrian capercaillie). There is also a population of the rare Kerry slug. The proposed integration of the biosphere reserves is expected to benefit endangered wildlife such as the Cantabrian brown bear and Cantabrian Capercaillie, by reversing habitat fragmentation. There are recovery plans in operation for both of these animals as they need to extend their range within the Cantabrian mountains in order to build sustainable populations.

=== Special Protection Area ===
Bosque de Muniellos (Spanish for "Muniellos Wood") is a Special Protection Area for bird-life under the European Union's Birds Directive. Muniellos has also been designated an Important Bird Area by Birdlife International.
