= Double disk =

Double album is a double CD album

Double disk or double-disk may refer to:

- Double Album (NOFX Album), 2022
- Double-disk diffusion test
- Vertisoft DoubleDisk, a DOS disk compression software by Vertisoft
