= Quinacillin =

Beta-lactam antibiotic

Clinical data
- ATC code: None

Identifiers
- IUPAC name: 3-{[(2S,5R,6R)-2-Carboxy-3,3-dimethyl-7-oxo-4-thia-1-azabicyclo[3.2.0]hept-6-yl]carbamoyl}-2-quinoxalinecarboxylic acid
- CAS Number: 1596-63-0
- PubChem CID: 92894
- ChemSpider: 83858
- UNII: 83NB50X92M
- ChEMBL: ChEMBL2104733
- CompTox Dashboard (EPA): DTXSID401043140
- ECHA InfoCard: 100.014.984

Chemical and physical data
- Formula: C_{18}H_{16}N_{4}O_{6}S
- Molar mass: 416.41 g·mol^{−1}
- 3D model (JSmol): Interactive image
- SMILES: CC1([C@@H](N2[C@H](S1)[C@@H](C2=O)NC(=O)c3c(nc4ccccc4n3)C(=O)O)C(=O)O)C
- InChI: InChI=1S/C18H16N4O6S/c1-18(2)12(17(27)28)22-14(24)11(15(22)29-18)21-13(23)9-10(16(25)26)20-8-6-4-3-5-7(8)19-9/h3-6,11-12,15H,1-2H3,(H,21,23)(H,25,26)(H,27,28)/t11-,12+,15-/m1/s1; Key:GPMSLJIYNWBYEL-TYNCELHUSA-N

Quinacillin is a penicillin antibiotic which can reversibly deactivate beta-lactamase enzymes. Activity against Staphylococcus aureus is much more potent than against other Gram-positive organisms.
