= Temocillin =

Chemical compound

Clinical data
- AHFS/Drugs.com: International Drug Names
- ATC code: J01CA17 (WHO)

Identifiers
- IUPAC name: (2S,5R,6S)-6-[(Carboxy-3-thienylacetyl)amino]- 6-methoxy-3,3-dimethyl-7-oxo-4-thia-1-azabicyclo[3.2.0] heptane-2-carboxylic acid,
- CAS Number: 66148-78-5
- PubChem CID: 171758
- ChemSpider: 150149
- UNII: 03QB156W6I
- KEGG: D06064
- ChEBI: CHEBI:51817
- CompTox Dashboard (EPA): DTXSID201009398
- ECHA InfoCard: 100.060.148

Chemical and physical data
- Formula: C_{16}H_{18}N_{2}O_{7}S_{2}
- Molar mass: 414.45 g·mol^{−1}
- 3D model (JSmol): Interactive image
- SMILES: O=C(O)[C@@H]2N3C(=O)[C@@](OC)(NC(=O)C(c1ccsc1)C(=O)O)[C@H]3SC2(C)C
- InChI: InChI=1S/C16H18N2O7S2/c1-15(2)9(12(22)23)18-13(24)16(25-3,14(18)27-15)17-10(19)8(11(20)21)7-4-5-26-6-7/h4-6,8-9,14H,1-3H3,(H,17,19)(H,20,21)(H,22,23)/t8?,9-,14+,16-/m0/s1; Key:BVCKFLJARNKCSS-DWPRYXJFSA-N

Temocillin is a β-lactamase-resistant penicillin introduced by Beecham, marketed by Eumedica Pharmaceuticals as Negaban in Belgium, France, The Netherlands, Luxemburg, Sweden, Spain, United Kingdom and Ireland; and as Temopen in Germany. It is used primarily for the treatment of multiple drug-resistant, Gram-negative bacteria.
It is actually a 6-methoxy Ticarcillin; it is also a carboxypenicillin.

== Pharmacology ==
Temocillin is a β-lactamase-resistant penicillin. It is not active against Gram-positive bacteria or bacteria with altered penicillin-binding proteins.

It is normally active against Moraxella catarrhalis, Brucella abortus, Burkholderia cepacia, Citrobacter species, Escherichia coli, Haemophilus influenzae, Klebsiella pneumoniae, Pasteurella multocida, Proteus mirabilis, Salmonella typhimurium, and Yersinia enterocolitica. It is also active against some Enterobacter species, Morganella morganii, and Serratia species. Temocillin has no useful activity against Acinetobacter species or Pseudomonas aeruginosa.

Its primary use is against Enterobacteriaceae, and in particular against strains producing extended-spectrum β-lactamase or AmpC β-lactamase. Temocillin is also usually active against KPC-producing K. pneumoniae, and synergistic activity has been demonstrated when administered alongside fosfomycin.

Temocillin has also been reported in the management of urinary tract, bloodstream and intra-abdominal infections, with a favorable safety and ecological profile. It has additionally been used in outpatient parenteral antimicrobial therapy (OPAT), including administration by the subcutaneous route.

In the phase 3 ASTARTÉ randomised trial, temocillin was non-inferior to carbapenems for the targeted treatment of bacteraemia due to third-generation cephalosporin-resistant Enterobacterales (clinical success 74% vs 73%). In a multicentre real-world study from Italy, temocillin was also administered by continuous infusion through elastomeric pumps within OPAT programmes, allowing clinically stable patients to complete intravenous treatment outside the hospital.

== Dosage ==
The common dose is 2 g intravenously every 12 hours and the high dose, notably in critically ill patients, is 2g every 8 hours. Theoretical reasons exist for giving temocillin as a continuous intravenous infusion in severe disease a single loading dose of 2 g is given intravenously followed by a 4-g or 6-g infusion over 24 hours. According to the SPC, chemical and physical in-use stability has been demonstrated for 24 hours at 25 °C for the following solvents: water for injection, physiological saline (0.9% sodium chloride), dextrose 5%, sodium chloride compound (Ringer's solution), Hartmann solution (sodium lactate compound + Ringer's lactate solution). Temocillin for intravenous injection is diluted in 10 to 20 ml of sterile water; it is diluted in less than 2 ml of sterile water when being prepared for intramuscular injection; the continuous infusion is diluted in 48 ml of sterile water for ease of administration (2 ml per hour). To reduce pain, the intramuscular injection may be made up using sterile 0.5–1% lidocaine (lignocaine) instead of sterile water. Subcutaneous administration of temocillin, although off-label, has been investigated in selected patients, showing lower peak concentrations but sustained plasma exposure above pharmacokinetic/pharmacodynamic targets over the dosing interval, with limited clinical data suggesting feasibility and tolerability in OPAT settings.

Temocillin may be given to patients with impaired renal function after the dose has been adapted:

Creatinine clearance (mL/min)	Dosage per administration	Interval between administrations
More than 60	2 g	12 h
60 to 30	1 g	12 h
30 to 10	1 g	24 h

In case of intermittent high-flux hemodialysis: 1 g (I.V. injection) per 24 h of inter-dialytic session, preferably at the end of the hemodialysis (1 g q24 h, 2 g q48 h, 3 g q72 h). In case of continuous peritoneal dialysis in ambulatory patients: 1 g every 24 hours.

No oral preparation of temocillin is licensed.

== Adverse effects ==
The undesirable effects of temocillin are those of any β-lactam antibiotic. In particular, it has been associated with angioedema and anaphylaxis in penicillin-allergic patients. Animal studies have not shown any induction of Clostridioides difficile infection. As with any other penicillin, convulsions can occur if very high doses are given.

== Synthesis ==
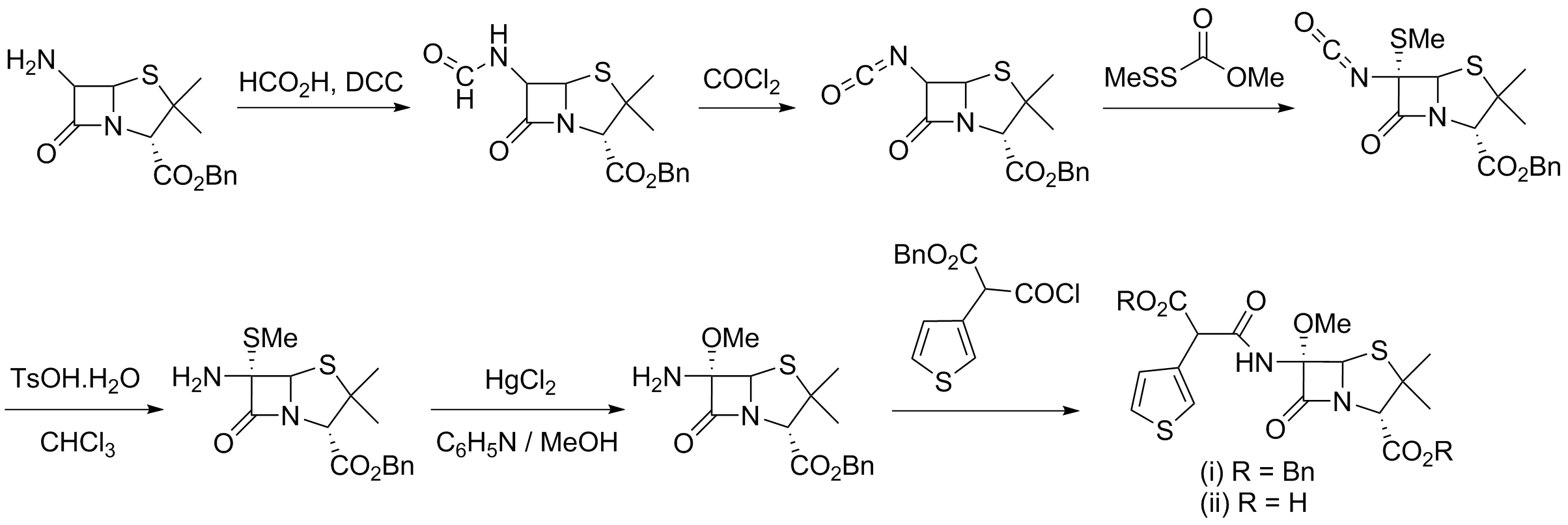
Temocillin synthesis:
