= Disk diffusion test =

Type of microbiology test

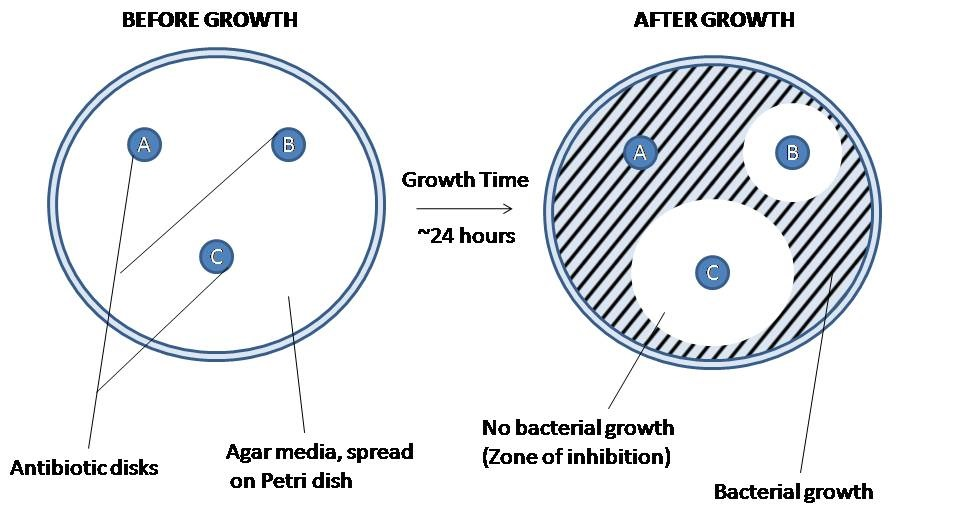
In diagnostic laboratories, the disk diffusion test is used to determine the susceptibility of clinical isolates of bacteria to different antibiotics. An effective antibiotic will produce a large zone of inhibition (disk C), while an ineffective antibiotic may not affect bacterial growth at all (disk A). Antibiotics to which a bacterial isolate is partially susceptible will produce an intermediate size zone of inhibition (disk B).

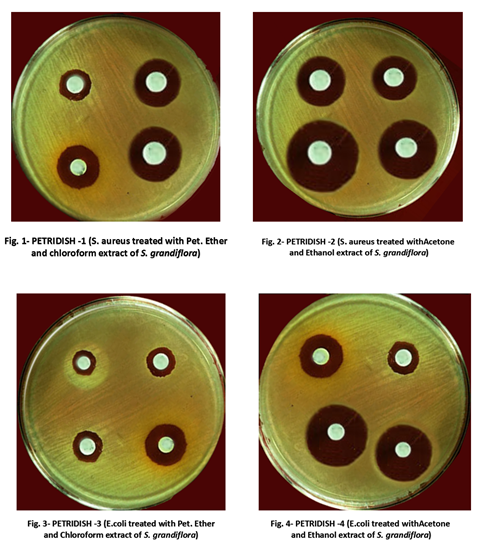
In drug discovery laboratories, the disk diffusion test is used to screen natural product extracts for antibacterial activity. Extracts with antibacterial activity, for example the petroleum ether, chloroform, ethanol and acetone extracts above, will produce a zone of inhibition.

The disk diffusion test (also known as the agar diffusion test, Kirby–Bauer test, disc-diffusion antibiotic susceptibility test, disc-diffusion antibiotic sensitivity test and KB test) is a culture-based microbiology assay used in diagnostic and drug discovery laboratories. In diagnostic labs, the assay is used to determine the susceptibility of bacteria isolated from a patient's infection to clinically approved antibiotics. This allows physicians to prescribe the most appropriate antibiotic treatment. In drug discovery labs, especially bioprospecting labs, the assay is used to screen biological material (e.g. plant extracts, bacterial fermentation broths) and drug candidates for antibacterial activity. When bioprospecting, the assay can be performed with paired strains of bacteria to achieve dereplication and provisionally identify antibacterial mechanism of action.

In diagnostic laboratories, the test is performed by inoculating the surface of an agar plate with bacteria isolated from a patient's infection. Antibiotic-containing paper disks are then applied to the agar and the plate is incubated. If an antibiotic stops the bacteria from growing or kills the bacteria, there will be an area around the disk where the bacteria have not grown enough to be visible. This is called a zone of inhibition. The susceptibility of the bacterial isolate to each antibiotic can then be semi-quantified by comparing the size of these zones of inhibition to databases of information on known antibiotic-susceptible, moderately susceptible and resistant bacteria. In this way, it is possible to identify the most appropriate antibiotic for treating a patient's infection. Although the disk diffusion test cannot be used to differentiate bacteriostatic and bactericidal activity, it is less cumbersome than other susceptibility testing methods such as broth dilution.

In drug discovery labs, the disk diffusion test is performed slightly differently than in diagnostic labs. In this setting, it is not the bacterial strain that must be characterized, but a test extract (e.g. a plant or microbial extract). The agar plate is therefore inoculated with a bacterial strain of known phenotype (often an ATCC or NCTC strain), and disks containing the test extract are applied to the surface (see below). Zone of inhibition sizes cannot be used as a semi-quantitative measure of antibacterial potency because different extracts contain molecules with different diffusion characteristics (different molecular sizes, hydrophilicities etc.). Zone of inhibition sizes can be used for the purpose of dereplication though. This is achieved by testing each extract against paired strains of bacteria (e.g. streptomycin-susceptible and -resistant strains to identify streptomycin-containing extracts). Paired strains (e.g. wild type and target overexpressing strains) can also be used to identify antibacterial mechanism of action.

== History ==
Agar diffusion was first used by Martinus Beijerinck in 1889 to study the effect of auxins on bacterial growth. However, the method has been developed, refined and standardized by many scientists and scientific organizations over the years including George F. Reddish, Norman Heatley, James G. Vincent, Alfred W. Bauer, William M.M. Kirby, John C. Sherris, Hans Martin Ericsson, the World Health Organization, the Clinical and Laboratory Standards Institute, the Swedish Reference Group for Antibiotics, the Deutsches Institut für Normung, the British Society for Antimicrobial Chemotherapy and others.

== Principle ==
A pure bacterial culture is suspended in saline, its turbidity is standardized, and it is swabbed uniformly across an agar plate. An antibiotic- or extract-impregnated filter paper disk is then placed on the surface of the agar. The disk constituent(s) diffuse from the filter paper into the agar. The concentration of these constituents will be highest next to the disk and will decrease as the distance from the disk increases. If the antibiotic or extract is effective against bacteria at a certain concentration, no colonies will grow where the concentration in the agar is greater than or equal to the effective concentration. This is the zone of inhibition. In general, larger zones of inhibition correlate with lower minimum inhibitory concentrations (MICs) of antibiotic or extract for that bacterial strain. An exception to this is when molecules of the antibiotic or extract are large or hydrophobic because these diffuse through the agar slowly.

== Standard method ==
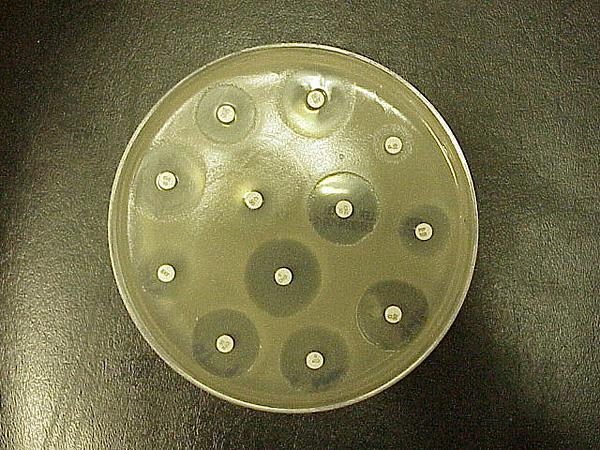
Standard Kirby–Bauer testing: White disks containing antibiotics shown on an agar plate of bacteria. Circular zones of poor bacterial growth surround some disks, indicating susceptibility to the antibiotic.

=== Agar plate and inoculum preparation ===
All aspects of the Kirby–Bauer procedure are standardized to ensure consistent and accurate results. Because of this, a laboratory must adhere to these standards. The media used in Kirby–Bauer testing must be Mueller–Hinton agar at only 4 mm deep, poured into either 100 mm or 150 mm Petri dishes. The pH level of the agar must be between 7.2 and 7.4. Bacterial inoculum is prepared by diluting a broth culture to match a 0.5 McFarland turbidity standard, which is equivalent to approximately 150 million cells per mL.

=== Inoculation and incubation ===
Using aseptic technique, broth culture of a specific organism is collected with a sterile swab. In the case of Gram negative bacteria, excess liquid is removed from the swab by gently pressing or rotating it against the inside of the tube. The swab is then streaked across a Mueller–Hinton agar plate to form a bacterial lawn. To obtain uniform growth, the agar plate is streaked with the swab in one direction, rotated 120° and streaked again, rotated another 120° and streaked again. Using an antibiotic disk dispenser, disks containing specific antibiotics are then applied to the plate. This must be done within 15 minutes of inoculation. Flame-sterilized forceps are used to gently press each disk onto the agar and ensure it is attached. Plates are then incubated overnight, usually at a temperature of 35 °C. Plates must be incubated within 15 minutes of applying antibiotic disks.

=== Test media modifications ===
Certain bacteria require addition of 5% solution of mechanically defibrinated horse blood and β-NAD (MH-F agar). The following table shows media requirements of commonly tested microorganisms:

Disk diffusion media requirements
| Standard MH agar | MH-F agar |
|---|---|
| Enterobacterales; Pseudomonas spp.; Stenotrophomonas maltophilia; Acinetobacter spp.; Staphylococcus spp.; Enterococcus spp.; Aeromonas spp.; Achromobacter xylosoxidans; Vibrio spp.; Bacillus spp.; Burkholderia pseudomallei | Streptococcus groups A, B, C, G; Streptococcus pneumoniae; Streptococcus viridans group; Haemophilus influenzae; Moraxella catarrhalis; Listeria monocytogenes; Pasteurella multocida; Campylobacter jejuni and C. coli; Corynebacterium; Aerococcus sanguinicola and A. urinae; Kingella kingae; Brucella melitensis |

=== Quality control ===
To ensure veracity of test results, quality control methods must be used. In order to monitor the performance of the test, special bacterial strains are used as positive or negative control. When efficacy of β-lactamase is tested, special strains that exhibit β-lactam resistance are used. Additionally, specific media are used to test certain antibiotics. For example, when testing co-trimoxazole susceptibility, media with excess thymine and thymidine are recommended. The following table lists commonly used quality control strains in the disk diffusion method:

Quality control strains (as of January 2025)
| Bacterium | Strain | | | | | | Description | Antibiotics tested |
| Bacterium | ATCC | NCTC | CIP | DSM | CCUG | CECT | Description | Antibiotics tested |
|---|---|---|---|---|---|---|---|---|
| E. coli | 25922 | 12241 | 76.24 | 1103 | 17620 | 434 | susceptible (wild type) | neomycin, colistin, kanamycin, cephalexin, gentamicin, cefamandole, cephalotin, tetracycline, cephaloglycin, cephaloridine, nalidixic acid, chloramphenicol |
| E. coli | 35218 | 11954 | 102181 | 5923 | 30600 | 943 | produce TEM-1 β-lactamase, resistant to ampicillin (used to check β-lactamase component of β-lactam combination disks) | |
| E. coli | - | 13353 | - | - | - | - | produces CTX-M-15 and OXA-1 (used to check β-lactamase component of β-lactam combination disks) | cefotaxime |
| Klebsiella pneumoniae | 700603 (Note: Klebsiella quasipneumoniae Brisse et al) | 13368 | - | - | 45421 | 7787 | produces SHV-18 (an extended-spectrum β-lactamase, used to check β-lactamase component of β-lactam combination disks) | |
| Klebsiella pneumoniae | BAA-2814 | - | - | - | - | - | produces KPC-3, SHV-11, TEM-1 (used to check β-lactamase component of β-lactam combination disks) | novel β-lactam/β-lactamase inhibitor combinations (e.g., meropenem/vaborbactam) |
| Pseudomonas aeruginosa | 27853 | 12903 | 76.110 | 1117 | 17619 | 108 | susceptible (wild type) | |
| Staphylococcus aureus | 29213 | 12973 | 103429 | 2569 | 15915 | 794 | produces β-lactamases (weak) | |
| Staphylococcus aureus | - | 12493 | - | - | 67181 | | MRSA (mecA plasmid-positive) | methicillin and other antibiotics affected by MRSA strains |
| Enterococcus faecalis | 29212 | 12697 | 103214 | 2570 | 9997 | 795 | susceptible (wild type) | |
| Enterococcus faecalis | 51299 | 13379 | 104676 | 12956 | 34289 | - | HLAR (aminoglycoside-modyfing enzyme), resistant to vancomycin (vanB plasmid-positive) | gentamicin, streptomycin |
| Streptococcus pneumoniae | 49619 | 12977 | 104340 | 11967 | 33638 | - | resistant to benzylpenicillin | |
| Haemophilus influenzae | 49766 | 12975 | 103570 | 11970 | 29539 | - | susceptible (wild type) | |
| Haemophilus influenzae | 49247 | 12699 | 104604 | 9999 | 26214 | - | reduced suscibility to β-lactams (exhibits modified penicillin binding proteins) | |
| Campylobacter jejuni | 33560 | 11351 | 70.2T | 4688 | 11284 | - | susceptible (wild type), requires microaerobic environment and higher incubation temperature (41±1°C) | |

== Alternate methods ==
Several variations of the disk diffusion method have been developed including the Oxford penicillin cup and Etest methods used in hospital diagnostic laboratories, and the well diffusion, cylinder diffusion and bioautography methods used in drug discovery and development laboratories.

=== Oxford penicillin cup method ===
Disks containing increasing antibiotic concentrations are placed on a seeded bacterial lawn on the agar surface and plates are incubated. Zone sizes are measured from the edge of the disk to the end of the clear zone. Interpretation is more complicated in mixed susceptibility populations. These are plotted as linear dimensions or squares of distances as a function of the natural logarithm of antibiotic concentration in the disks. The MIC is determined from the zero intercept of a linear regression fit through the data. The intercept itself is the logarithm of the MIC. The slope of the regression line is related to the diffusion coefficient of that particular antibiotic in the agar.

=== EUCAST Rapid Antibiotic Susceptibility Test (RAST) ===
The RAST method serves as a fast means of ascertaining antibiotic susceptibility and was created as a modification of the classic disk diffusion test. It allows to shorten the time of incubation to 16-20 hours. Test scores are read after 4, 6, 8 and 16-20 hours. Compared to the standard method, RAST does not give distinct zones of inhibition within such a short timespan (all bacteria except for S. pneumoniae have a chance of being possible to read after 6 hours higher than 90%). As for quality control strains, they are diluted 1:1 000 000 and defibrinated horse or sheep blood is added. Special RAST breakpoint tables should be used when interpreting the results due to method calibration differences.

Validated quality control strains include: E. coli ATCC 25922, P. aeruginosa ATCC 27853, S. aureus ATCC 29213, E. faecalis ATCC 29212, S. pneumoniae ATCC 49619.

==== Screening for antibiotic resistance mechanisms in RAST ====
RAST allows for rapid determination of possible antibiotic resistance in tested cultures. It allows to check for ESBL and/or carbapenemase producing E. coli and K. pneumoniae, using cefotaxime/ceftazidime (after 4 hours) and meropenem (after 6 hours) respectively. However, these results are not quantitative and should be used only for screening in routine medical tests. In clinical trials, RAST method led to significant improvements in predicting efficacy of antibiotic therapy.

=== Disk pre-diffusion method ===
Disks containing antibiotics are placed on an uninoculated Mueller-Hinton agar plate and incubated for 2 hours. Then, they are removed and the bacterial suspension previously prepared using broth microdilution is applied and another disk with a different antibiotic is placed precisely in the same place as the previous one. After incubation for 16-20 hours results are correlated with the first antibiotic's MIC values. An example of the pre-diffusion method is testing in vitro efficacy of ceftazidime/avibactam (primary disks) in terms of aztreonam (secondary disks).

=== Antifungal drug testing ===
Disk diffusion method can be used to test susceptibility to antifungals.

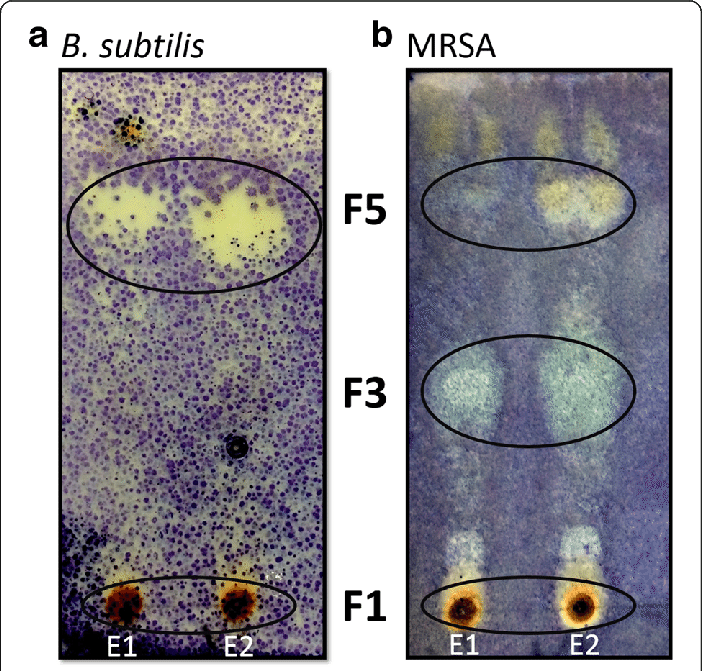
Bioautography assay with two extracts from the broth of different cultures of Vibrio sp. A1SM3-36-8 spotted on each TLC plate (a) against B. subtilis, and (b) against MRSA

=== Bioautography ===
Comparing to classical disk-based methods, bioautography utilises thin-layer chromatography to separate constituents of the tested mixture. Then, the TLC plate can be either placed on the inoculated agar and be allowed to diffuse into it (contact bioautography) or be covered with microbe-containing broth (direct bioautography). Then, the sample is incubated and zones of inhibitions are measured. Alternatively, the TLC plate can be covered with molten agar in the agar overlay bioautography.

To visualise zones of inhibitions in direct bioautography, reagents that detect dehydrogenase activity are used (e.g., tetrazolium salts, which are converted by microbial dehydrogenases into chromogenic formazans).

== Other images ==
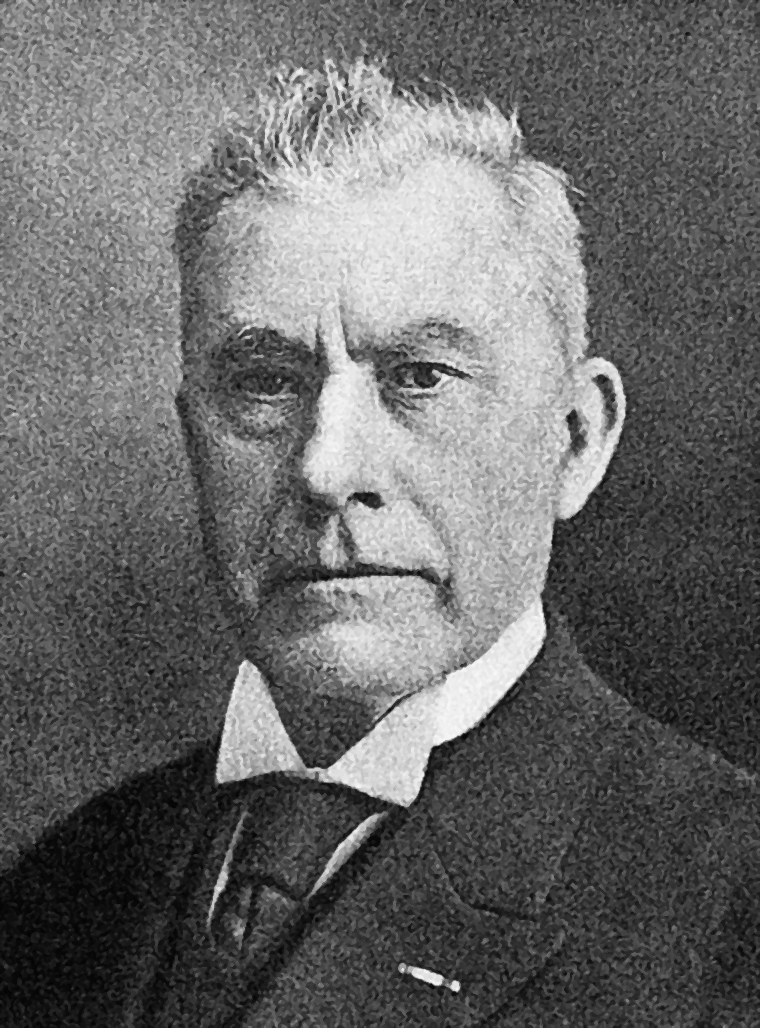
Agar diffusion was first used in 1889 by Martinus Beijerinck.

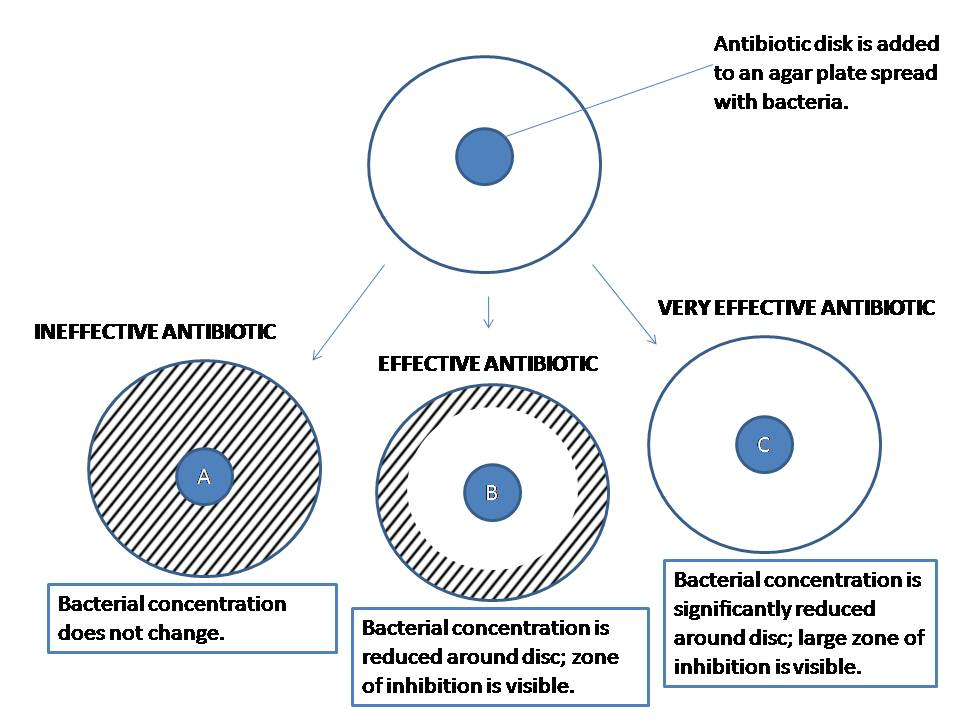
A close-up look at the results of an agar diffusion test

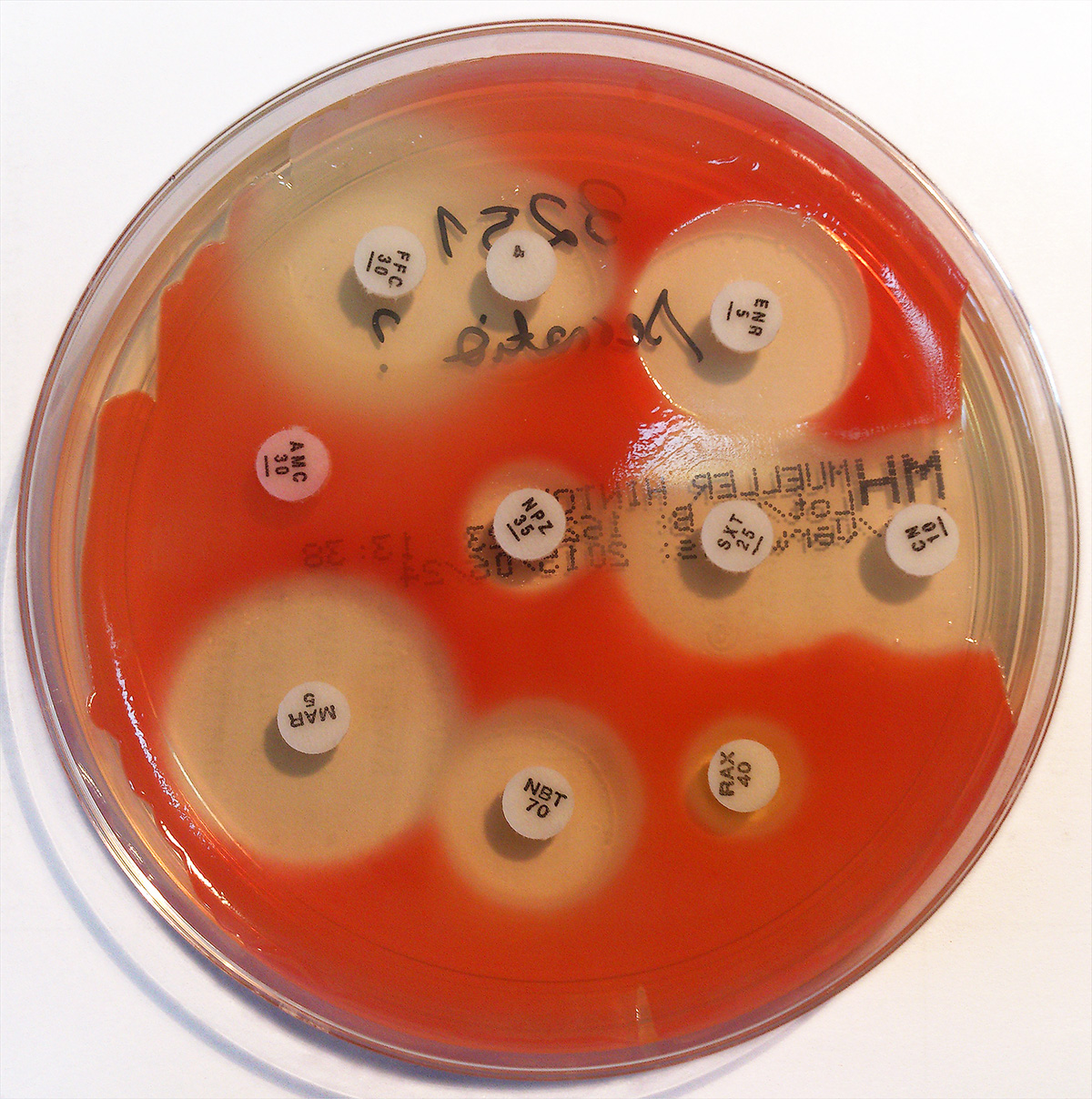
An antibiogram of Serratia marcescens. Each disk is labelled with the antibiotic it contains (e.g. AMC30, 30 μg amoxicillin/clavulanic acid)

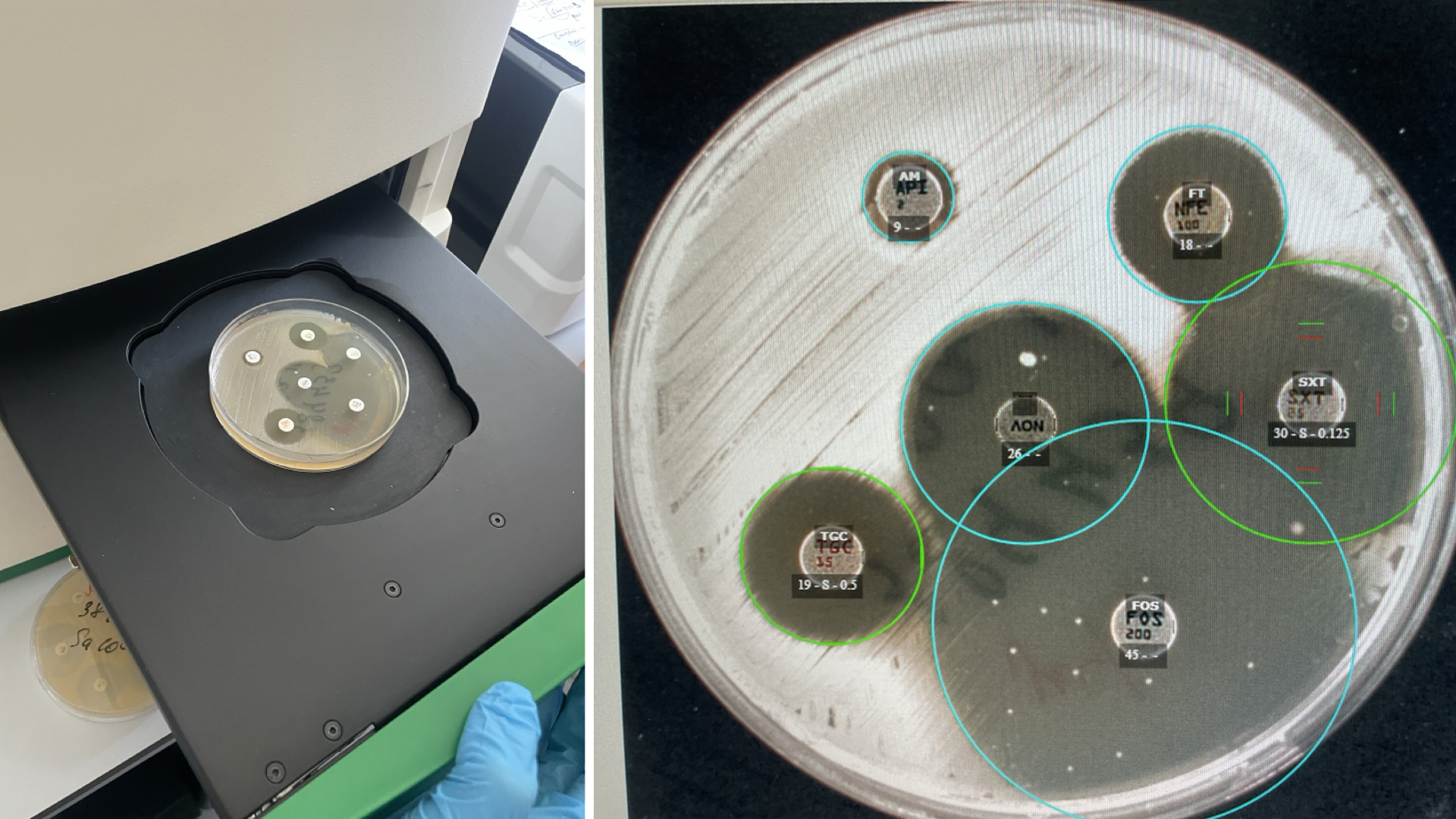
Automated culture plate reader to measure inhibition zone diameters

== See also ==
- Antibiotic sensitivity testing
- Double-disk diffusion test
- Etest
