= John Charles Sherris =

Medical doctor (1921–2021)

John Charles Sherris (March 8, 1921 – May 2, 2021) was an English-American medical doctor, pathologist, and bacteriologist. He was the president of the American Society for Microbiology (ASM) in 1983.

== Biography ==
Sherris grew up near London. In Kensington in 1944 he married Elizabeth L. McArthur. At the University of London, Sherris graduated in 1944 with an MB BS, in 1948 with a higher Doctor of Medicine degree, and in 1950 with a D.Sc. in pathology, specializing in bacteriology. In the late 1940s, he began antibiotic research with Mary Ethel Florey, a member of the Oxford team that developed penicillin for clinical use. At the beginning of his career, he received hospital appointments at London's King Edward VII's Hospital and Oxford's Radcliffe Infirmary. In 1953 he became a faculty member in the bacteriology department of the University of Manchester. In 1959 he moved with his family to Seattle to become an associate professor in the University of Washington's department of bacteriology. He was promoted to full professor in 1963, retaining that position until he retired as professor emeritus. From 1959 to 1970 he directed the University of Washington's Clinical Microbiology Laboratories. Beginning in 1970 he chaired the University of Washington's department of microbiology and immunology for about a decade.

Sherris, a pioneer in clinical microbiology, is known for his contributions to developing accurate and reliable methods for determining the antibiotic susceptibilities of bacteria sampled from patients. He, with colleagues Alfred W. Bauer, William M. M. Kirby, and Marvin Turck, developed and validated a method called "disk diffusion susceptibility testing". They summarized their method in a 1966 paper, which, by the end of the year 2012, had been cited over 6,000 times. The method (sometimes called the Kirby-Bauer test) became a huge success used worldwide by hospitals. Continuing this work on antibiotic sensitivity testing, Sherris became a member of an international collaborative study sponsored by the World Health Organization (WHO). In 1971, he co-authored, with the Swedish researcher Hans Ericsson, a report on the WHO international study.

In addition to working on antibiotic sensitivity testing, Sherris did research on "bacterial identification, automation in clinical microbiology, and the epidemiology and mechanisms of antibiotic resistance." He was an outstanding teacher and promoted in the late 1960s the reform of the curriculum of the University of Washington Medical School. With his wife Elizabeth doing the typing and indexing, he was the editor-in-chief of the textbook Medical Microbiology: An Introduction to Infectious Diseases, published in 1984 by Elsevier. Subsequent editions were published under the title Sherris Medical Microbiology. The 2014 6th edition was reviewed in Frontiers in Cellular and Infection Microbiology. The 2021 8th edition has 992 pages.

Sherris served on the editorial boards of The Journal of Infectious Diseases and Antimicrobial Agents and Chemotherapy and was the editor-in-chief of the ASM Cumitech series of clinical microbiology techniques.

In 1975 the Karolinska Institute awarded him an honorary doctorate in medicine. In 1978 he received the Becton Dickinson Award in Clinical Microbiology. He received in 1988 the bioMérieux Sonnenwirth Award for Leadership in Clinical Microbiology and in 2004 the ABMM/ABMLI Professional Recognition Award.

John Sherris's wife Elizabeth died in 2014 after 70 years of marriage. They had a son, Peter M., born in 1947, and a daughter, Jacqueline R., born in 1951. Upon his death, John Sherris was survived by his two children, three grandchildren, and two great-grandchildren. Peter McArthur Sherris, M.D., became a cardiologist practicing in Vallejo, California. Jacqueline R. Sherris became an affiliate faculty member in the School of Public Health of the University of Washington.

== Selected publications ==
- Sherris, J. C. (1952). "Two Small Colony Variants of Staph. Aureus Isolated in Pure Culture from Closed Infected Lesions and their Carbon Dioxide Requirements". Journal of Clinical Pathology. 5 (4): 354–355. doi:10.1136/jcp.5.4.354. PMC 1023676. PMID 13011225.
- Petersdorf, Robert G.; Sherris, John C. (1965). "Methods and significance of in vitro testing of bacterial sensitivity to drugs". The American Journal of Medicine. 39 (5): 766–779. doi:10.1016/0002-9343(65)90096-3. PMID 5319390.
- Bulger, Roger J.; Sherris, John C. (1966). "The Clinical Significance of Aeromonas hydrophila". Archives of Internal Medicine. 118 (6): 562–564. doi:10.1001/archinte.1966.00290180038007.
- Drew, W. Lawrence; Barry, A. L.; O'Toole, Richard; Sherris, John C. (1972). "Reliability of the Kirby-Bauer Disc Diffusion Method for Detecting Methicillin-Resistant Strains of Staphylococcus aureus". Applied Microbiology. 24 (2): 240–247. doi:10.1128/am.24.2.240-247.1972. PMC 380588. PMID 5071651.
- Reller, L. B.; Schoenknecht, F. D.; Kenny, M. A.; Sherris, J. C. (1974). "Antibiotic Susceptibility Testing of Pseudomonas aeruginosa: Selection of a Control Strain and Criteria for Magnesium and Calcium Content in Media". Journal of Infectious Diseases. 130 (5): 454–463. doi:10.1093/infdis/130.5.454. PMID 4370727.
- Findell, C. M.; Sherris, J. C. (1976). "Susceptibility of Enterobacter to Cefamandole: Evidence for a High Mutation Rate to Resistance". Antimicrobial Agents and Chemotherapy. 9 (6): 970–974. doi:10.1128/AAC.9.6.970. PMC 429659. PMID 938026.
- Williams, B. L.; Pantalone, R. M.; Sherris, J. C. (1976). "Subgingival microflora and periodontitis". Journal of Periodontal Research. 11 (1): 1–18. doi:10.1111/j.1600-0765.1976.tb00045.x. PMID 130475.
- Sherris, J. C. (1986). "Problems in in vitro determination of antibiotic tolerance in clinical isolates". Antimicrobial Agents and Chemotherapy. 30 (5): 633–637. doi:10.1128/AAC.30.5.633. PMC 176504. PMID 3541781.
