= Ceftizoxime =

Chemical compound

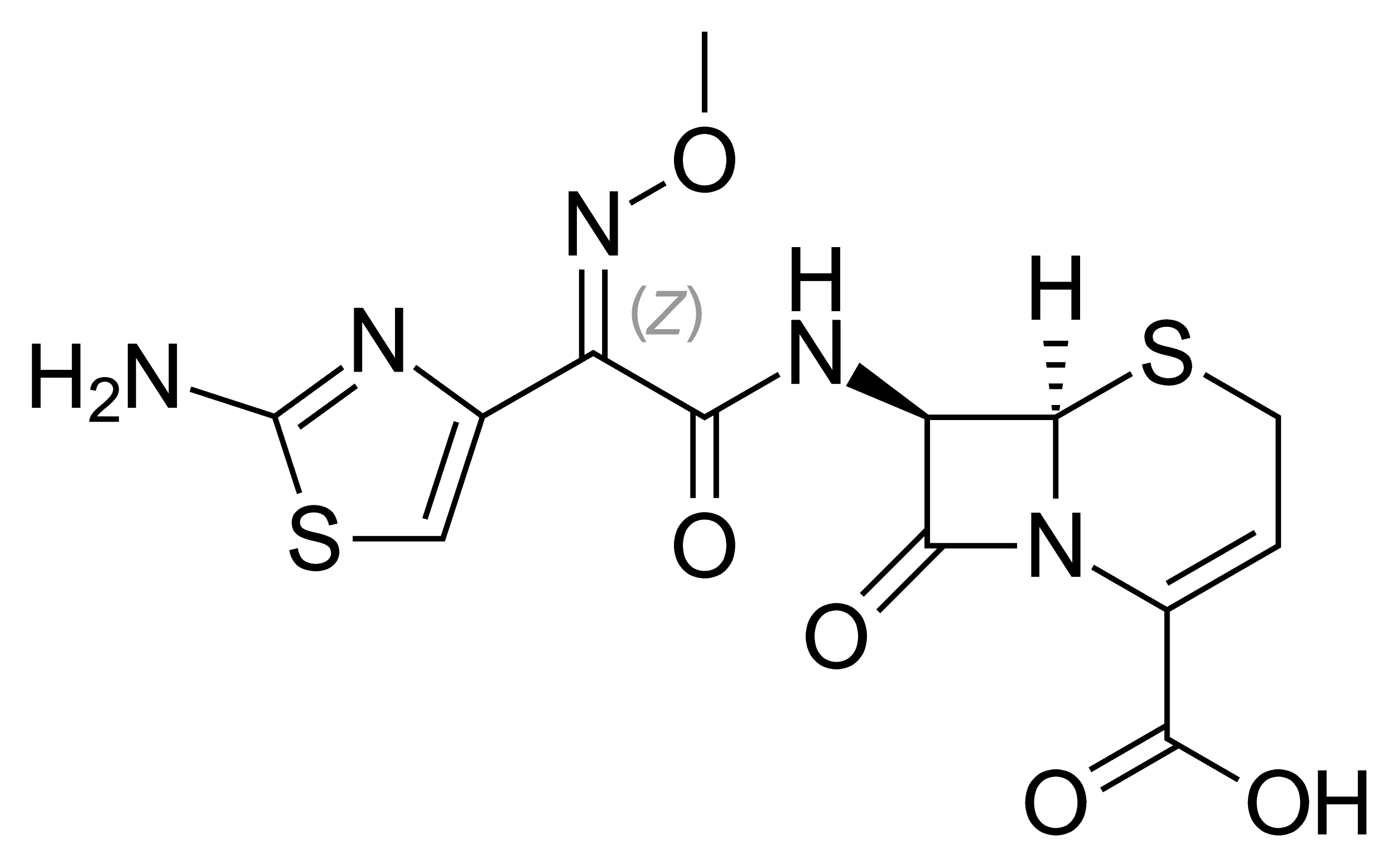

Clinical data
- Trade names: Cefizox
- AHFS/Drugs.com: Consumer Drug Information
- MedlinePlus: a684043
- ATC code: J01DD07 (WHO)

Identifiers
- IUPAC name: (6R,7R)-7-{[(2Z)-2-(2-amino-1,3-thiazol-4-yl)-2-methoxyiminoacetyl]amino}-8-oxo-5-thia-1-azabicyclo[4.2.0]oct-2-ene-2-carboxylic acid
- CAS Number: 68401-81-0 68401-82-1
- PubChem CID: 6533629
- ChemSpider: 5018818
- UNII: C43C467DPE
- KEGG: D07658
- ChEMBL: ChEMBL528
- CompTox Dashboard (EPA): DTXSID5022772
- ECHA InfoCard: 100.210.846

Chemical and physical data
- Formula: C_{13}H_{13}N_{5}O_{5}S_{2}
- Molar mass: 383.40 g·mol^{−1}

Ceftizoxime is a third-generation cephalosporin available for parenteral administration. Unlike other third-generation cephalosporins, the whole C-3 side chain in ceftizoxime has been removed to prevent deactivation by hydrolytic enzymes. It rather resembles cefotaxime in its properties, but is not subject to metabolism. It was removed from the US Market in 2007.

== Synthesis ==
Injectable third generation cephalosporin antibiotic related to cefotaxime, q.v. Exhibits broad spectrum activity and resistance to β-lactamase hydrolysis.

Ceftizoxime synthesis:
