= Nitrocefin =

Chemical compound

Identifiers
- IUPAC name: (6R,7R)-3-[(E)-2-(2,4-dinitrophenyl)ethenyl]- 8-oxo-7-[(2-thiophen-2-ylacetyl)amino]- 5-thia-1-azabicyclo[4.2.0]oct-2-ene- 2-carboxylic acid
- CAS Number: 41906-86-9
- PubChem CID: 6436140
- ChemSpider: 4940809
- UNII: EWP54G0J8F
- ChEMBL: ChEMBL480517
- CompTox Dashboard (EPA): DTXSID401318525
- ECHA InfoCard: 100.164.734

Chemical and physical data
- Formula: C_{21}H_{16}N_{4}O_{8}S_{2}
- Molar mass: 516.50 g·mol^{−1}
- 3D model (JSmol): Interactive image
- SMILES: O=C(Cc1cccs1)N[C@@H]1C(=O)N2C(C(=O)O)=C(/C=C/c3ccc([N+](=O)[O-])cc3[N+](=O)[O-])CS[C@H]12
- InChI: InChI=1S/C21H16N4O8S2/c26-16(9-14-2-1-7-34-14)22-17-19(27)23-18(21(28)29)12(10-35-20(17)23)4-3-11-5-6-13(24(30)31)8-15(11)25(32)33/h1-8,17,20H,9-10H2,(H,22,26)(H,28,29)/b4-3+/t17-,20-/m1/s1; Key:LHNIIDJCEODSHA-OQRUQETBSA-N

Nitrocefin is a chromogenic cephalosporin substrate routinely used to detect the presence of beta-lactamase enzymes produced by various microbes. Beta-lactamase mediated resistance to beta-lactam antibiotics such as penicillin is a widespread mechanism of resistance for a number of bacteria including members of the family Enterobacteriaceae, a major group of enteric Gram-negative bacteria. Other methods for beta-lactamase detection exist including PCR; however, nitrocefin allows for rapid beta-lactamase detection using few materials and inexpensive equipment.

== Structure ==
As a cephalosporin, nitrocefin contains a beta-lactam ring which is susceptible to beta-lactamase mediated hydrolysis. Once hydrolyzed, the degraded nitrocefin compound rapidly changes color from yellow to red. Although nitrocefin is considered a cephalosporin, it does not appear to have antimicrobial properties.

== Degradation and chromogenic properties ==
Intact beta-lactam antibiotics act by binding to penicillin binding proteins (PBPs) involved in peptidoglycan synthesis. Beta-lactamases hydrolyze the amide bond between the carbonyl carbon and the nitrogen in the beta-lactam ring of susceptible beta-lactams and members of beta-lactam subclasses (including certain cephalosporins). After hydrolysis of the amide bond, the antibiotic lacks the ability to bind bacterial PBPs and is rendered useless. Visual detection of this process is essentially impossible with most cephalosporins because the shift of ultraviolet absorption from the intact versus hydrolyzed product occurs outside of the visible spectrum. Hydrolysis of nitrocefin however, produces a shift of ultraviolet absorption inside the visible light spectrum from intact (yellow) nitrocefin (~380 nm) to degraded (red) nitrocefin (~500 nm) allowing visual detection of beta-lactamase activity on a macroscopic level.

== Detection assays ==
The following assays describe methods in which nitrocefin can be used to detect beta-lactamase enzymes using inexpensive materials and equipment. Working solutions of nitrocefin lie within 0.5 mg/mL to 1.0 mg/mL.

Slide Surface Assay

1. Add one drop of 0.5 mg/ml Nitrocefin to the surface of a clean glass slide.
2. Select a colony from an agar surface using a sterile loop and mix with the drop.
3. Appearance of red color within 20-30 min. indicates beta-lactamase activity.

Direct Contact Assay

1. Place one drop of 0.5 mg/ml Nitrocefin directly on the surface of an isolated colony.
2. Appearance of red color within 20-30 min. indicates beta-lactamase activity.

Broth Suspension Assay

1. Add 3-5 drops of 0.5 mg/ml Nitrocefin to 1 ml of broth suspension.
2. Appearance of red color within 20-30 min. indicates beta-lactamase activity.

Lysed Cell Assay

1. Lyse 1ml of cell suspension by sonication.
2. Add 3-5 drops of 0.5 mg/ml Nitrocefin to lysed cell suspension.
3. Appearance of red color within 20-30 min. indicates beta-lactamase activity.

Filter Paper Assay

1. Place a small piece of filter paper (~3 x 3 cm) in a clean petri dish or another clean isolated surface and saturate (3-5 ml) with 0.5 mg/ml Nitrocefin
2. Select an isolated colony and smear over the surface of the impregnated filter paper.
3. Appearance of red color within 20-30 min. indicates beta-lactamase activity

== See also ==
- Antibiotic resistance
- Antimicrobial
- Beta-lactam
- β-Lactam antibiotic
- Beta-lactamase
- Cephalosporin
- Peptidoglycan
