= Ticarcillin/clavulanic acid =

Combination antibiotic medication

Combination of
- Ticarcillin: β-lactam antibiotic
- Clavulanic acid: β-lactamase inhibitor

Clinical data
- Trade names: Timentin
- Routes of administration: Injection

Legal status
- Legal status: US: ℞-only

Identifiers
- CAS Number: 86482-18-0

Ticarcillin/clavulanic acid, or co-ticarclav, is a combination antibiotic consisting of ticarcillin, a β-lactam antibiotic, and clavulanic acid, a β-lactamase inhibitor. This combination results in an antibiotic with an increased spectrum of action and restored efficacy against ticarcillin-resistant bacteria that produce certain β-lactamases.
