= Ribonuclease Z =

Class of enzymes

TRNase Z

Identifiers
- EC no.: 3.1.26.11
- CAS no.: 98148-84-6

Databases
- IntEnz: IntEnz view
- BRENDA: BRENDA entry
- ExPASy: NiceZyme view
- KEGG: KEGG entry
- MetaCyc: metabolic pathway
- PRIAM: profile
- PDB structures: RCSB PDB PDBe PDBsum
Search
- PMC: articles
- PubMed: articles
- NCBI: proteins

TRNase Z (EC 3.1.26.11, 3 tRNase, tRNA 3 endonuclease, RNase Z, 3' tRNase) is an enzyme that, among other things, catalyses the reactions involved in the maturation of tRNAs. Here, it endonucleolytically cleaves the RNA and removes extra 3' nucleotides from the tRNA precursor, generating the 3' termini of tRNAs. A 3'-hydroxy group is left at the tRNA terminus and a 5'-phosphoryl group is left at the trailer molecule. Similarly, it processes tRNA-like molecules such as mascRNA.
