= Beta-lactamase =

Class of enzymes

Serine beta-lactamase
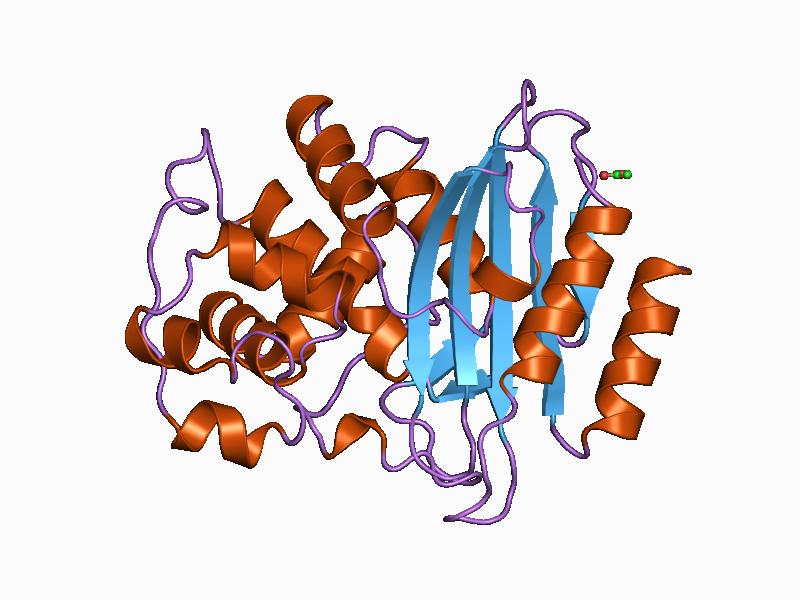
- Structure of Streptomyces albus beta-lactamase

Identifiers
- Symbol: β-lactamase domain
- Pfam: PF00144
- Pfam clan: CL0013
- InterPro: IPR001466
- PROSITE: PS00146
- SCOP2: 56601 / SCOPe / SUPFAM
Available protein structures:
- PDB: 1axb, 1blp, 1bsg, 1bue, 1e25, 1ghi, 1i2s, 1n9b, 1ong, 2cc1, 2gdn, 3dwz IPR001466 PF00144 (ECOD; PDBsum)
- AlphaFold: IPR001466; PF00144

Metallo-beta-lactamase
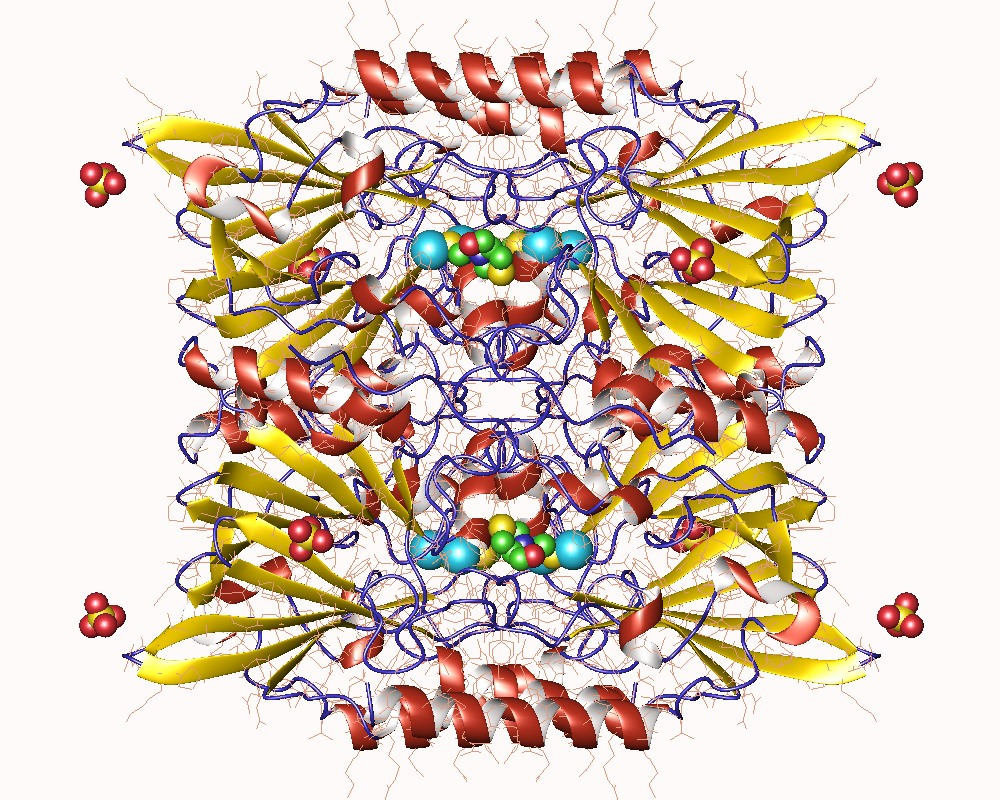
- Metallo-beta-lactamase L1 homotetramer, Stenotrophomonas

Identifiers
- Symbol: ?
- Pfam: PF00753
- Pfam clan: CL0381
- InterPro: IPR001279
Available protein structures:
- PDB: IPR001279 PF00753 (ECOD; PDBsum)
- AlphaFold: IPR001279; PF00753

β-lactamase
- Action of β-lactamase and decarboxylation of the intermediate

Identifiers
- EC no.: 3.5.2.6
- CAS no.: 9073-60-3

Databases
- BRENDA: enzyme data
- ExPASy: NiceZyme view
- KEGG: enzyme entry
- MetaCyc: metabolic pathway
- Rhea: reactions
- PDB structures: RCSB PDB PDBe PDBsum
- Gene Ontology: AmiGO / QuickGO
Search
- PMC: articles
- PubMed: articles
- NCBI: proteins

Core structure of penicillins (top) and cephalosporins (bottom). Beta-lactam ring in red.

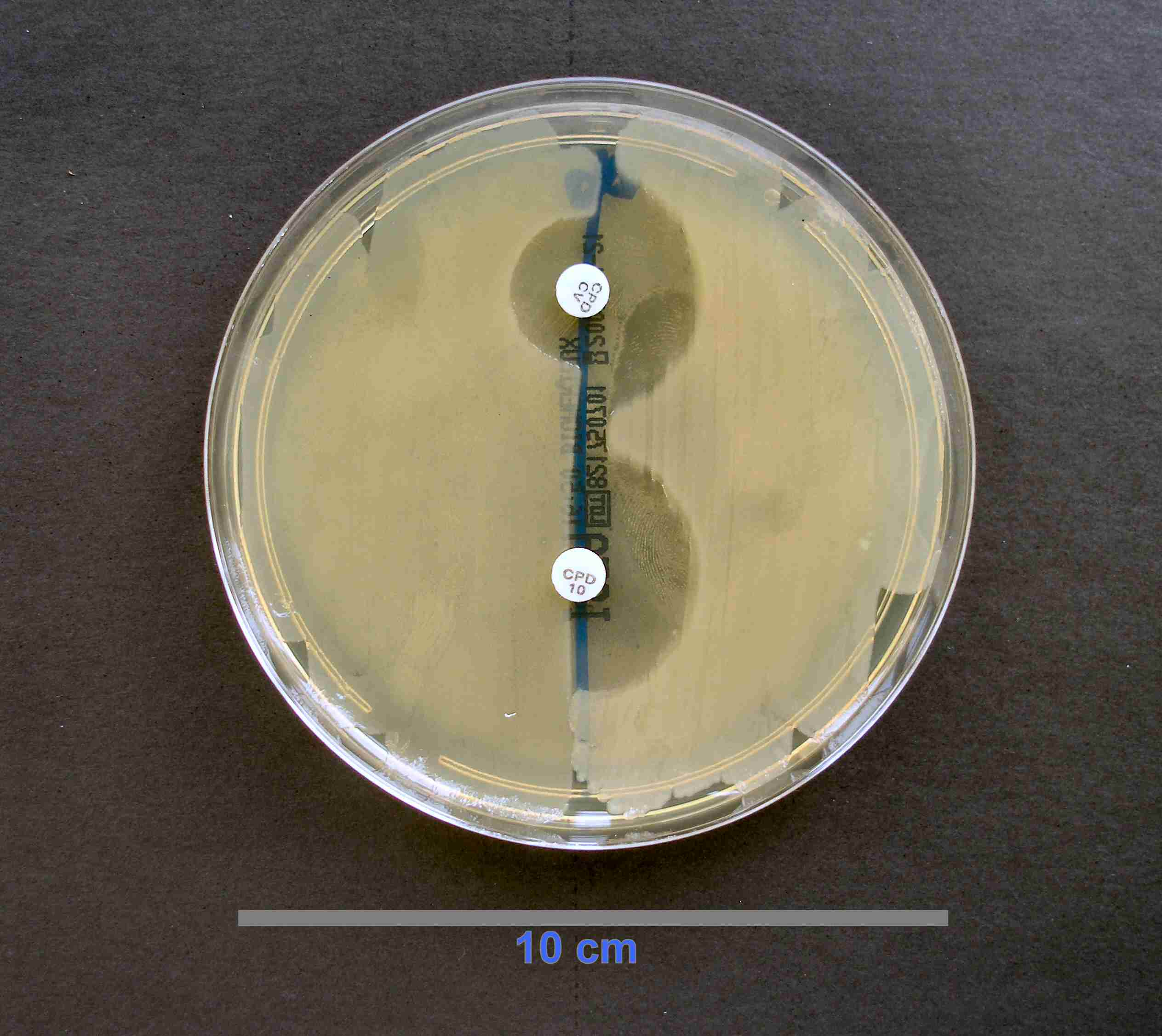
Escherichia coli bacteria on the right are sensitive to two beta-lactam antibiotics, and do not grow in the semi-circular regions surrounding antibiotics. E. coli bacteria on the left are resistant to beta-lactam antibiotics, and grow next to one antibiotic (bottom) and are less inhibited by another antibiotic (top).

Beta-lactamases (β-lactamases) are enzymes (EC 3.5.2.6) produced by bacteria that provide multi-resistance to beta-lactam antibiotics such as penicillins, cephalosporins, cephamycins, monobactams and carbapenems (ertapenem), although carbapenems are relatively resistant to beta-lactamase. Beta-lactamase provides antibiotic resistance by breaking the antibiotics' structure. These antibiotics all have a common element in their molecular structure: a four-atom ring known as a beta-lactam (β-lactam) ring. Through hydrolysis, the enzyme lactamase breaks the β-lactam ring open, deactivating the molecule's antibacterial properties.

Beta-lactamases produced by gram-negative bacteria are usually secreted, especially when antibiotics are present in the environment.

== Structure ==
The structure of a Streptomyces serine β-lactamase (SBLs) is given by PDB: 1BSG. The alpha-beta fold (InterPro: IPR012338) resembles that of a DD-transpeptidase, from which the enzyme is thought to have evolved. β-lactam antibiotics bind to DD-transpeptidases to inhibit bacterial cell wall biosynthesis. Serine β-lactamases are grouped by sequence similarity into types A, C, and D.

The other type of beta-lactamase is of the metallo type ("type B"). Metallo-beta-lactamases (MBLs) need metal ion(s) (1 or 2 Zn^{2+} ions) on their active site for their catalytic activities. The structure of the New Delhi metallo-beta-lactamase 1 is given by PDB: 6C89. It resembles a RNase Z, from which it is thought to have evolved.

== Mechanism of action ==
The two types of beta-lactamases work on the basis of the two basic mechanisms of opening the β-lactam ring.

The SBLs are similar in structure and mechanistically to the β-lactam target penicillin-binding proteins (PBPs) which are necessary for cell wall building and modifying. SBLs and PBPs both covalently change an active site serine residue. The difference between the PBPs and SBLs is that the latter generates free enzyme and inactive antibiotic by the very quick hydrolysis of the acyl-enzyme intermediate.

The MBLs use the Zn^{2+} ions to activate a binding site water molecule for the hydrolysis of the β-lactam ring. Zinc chelators have recently been investigated as metallo-β-lactamase inhibitors, as they are often able to restore carbapenem susceptibility.

== Penicillinase ==
Penicillinase is a specific type of β-lactamase, showing specificity for penicillins, again by hydrolysing the β-lactam ring. Molecular weights of the various penicillinases tend to cluster near 50 kilodaltons.

Penicillinase was the first β-lactamase to be identified. It was first isolated by Abraham and Chain in 1940 from E. coli (which are gram-negative) even before penicillin entered clinical use, but penicillinase production quickly spread to bacteria that previously did not produce it or produced it only rarely. Penicillinase-resistant beta-lactams such as methicillin were developed, but there is now widespread resistance to even these.

== Resistance in gram-negative bacteria ==
Among gram-negative bacteria, the emergence of resistance to extended-spectrum cephalosporins has been a major concern. It appeared initially in a limited number of bacterial species (E. cloacae, C. freundii, S. marcescens, and P. aeruginosa) that could mutate to hyperproduce their chromosomal class C β-lactamase. A few years later, resistance appeared in bacterial species not naturally producing AmpC enzymes (K. pneumoniae, Salmonella spp., P. mirabilis) due to the production of TEM- or SHV-type ESBLs (extended spectrum beta lactamases). Characteristically, such resistance has included oxyimino- (for example ceftizoxime, cefotaxime, ceftriaxone, and ceftazidime, as well as the oxyimino-monobactam aztreonam), but not 7-alpha-methoxy-cephalosporins (cephamycins; in other words, cefoxitin and cefotetan); has been blocked by inhibitors such as clavulanate, sulbactam or tazobactam and did not involve carbapenems and temocillin. Chromosomal-mediated AmpC β-lactamases represent a new threat, since they confer resistance to 7-alpha-methoxy-cephalosporins (cephamycins) such as cefoxitin or cefotetan but are not affected by commercially available β-lactamase inhibitors, and can, in strains with loss of outer membrane porins, provide resistance to carbapenems.

=== Extended-spectrum beta-lactamase (ESBL) ===
Members of this family commonly express β-lactamases (e.g., TEM-3, TEM-4, and SHV-2) which confer resistance to expanded-spectrum (extended-spectrum) cephalosporins. In the mid-1980s, this new group of enzymes, the extended-spectrum β-lactamases (ESBLs), was detected (first detected in 1979). The prevalence of ESBL-producing bacteria have been gradually increasing in acute care hospitals. The prevalence in the general population varies between countries, e.g. approximately 6% in Germany and France, 13% in Saudi Arabia, and 63% in Egypt.

ESBLs are beta-lactamases that hydrolyze extended-spectrum cephalosporins with an oxyimino side chain. These cephalosporins include cefotaxime, ceftriaxone, and ceftazidime, as well as the oxyimino-monobactam aztreonam. Thus, ESBLs confer multi-resistance to these antibiotics and related oxyimino-beta lactams. In typical circumstances, they derive from genes for TEM-1, TEM-2, or SHV-1 by mutations that alter the amino acid configuration around the active site of these β-lactamases. A broader set of β-lactam antibiotics are susceptible to hydrolysis by these enzymes. An increasing number of ESBLs not of TEM or SHV lineage have recently been described. The ESBLs are frequently plasmid encoded. Plasmids responsible for ESBL production frequently carry genes encoding resistance to other drug classes (for example, aminoglycosides). Therefore, antibiotic options in the treatment of ESBL-producing organisms are extremely limited. Carbapenems are the treatment of choice for serious infections due to ESBL-producing organisms, yet carbapenem-resistant (primarily ertapenem-resistant) isolates have recently been reported. ESBL-producing organisms may appear susceptible to some extended-spectrum cephalosporins. However, treatment with such antibiotics has been associated with high failure rates.

=== Types ===
==== TEM beta-lactamases (class A) ====
TEM-1 is the most commonly encountered beta-lactamase in gram-negative bacteria. Up to 90% of ampicillin resistance in E. coli is due to the production of TEM-1. Also responsible for the ampicillin and penicillin resistance that is seen in Haemophilus influenzae and Neisseria gonorrhoeae in increasing numbers. Although TEM-type beta-lactamases are most often found in Escherichia coli and Klebsiella pneumoniae, they are also found in other species of gram-negative bacteria with increasing frequency. The amino acid substitutions responsible for the extended-spectrum beta lactamase (ESBL) phenotype cluster around the active site of the enzyme and change its configuration, allowing access to oxyimino-beta-lactam substrates. Opening the active site to beta-lactam substrates also typically enhances the susceptibility of the enzyme to β-lactamase inhibitors, such as clavulanic acid. Single amino acid substitutions at positions 104, 164, 238, and 240 produce the ESBL phenotype, but ESBLs with the broadest spectrum usually have more than a single amino acid substitution. Based upon different combinations of changes, currently 140 TEM-type enzymes have been described. TEM-10, TEM-12, and TEM-26 are among the most common in the United States. The term TEM comes from the name of the Athenian patient (Temoniera) from which the isolate was recovered in 1963.

==== SHV beta-lactamases (class A) ====
SHV-1 shares 68 percent of its amino acids with TEM-1 and has a similar overall structure. The SHV-1 beta-lactamase is most commonly found in K. pneumoniae and is responsible for up to 20% of the plasmid-mediated ampicillin resistance in this species. ESBLs in this family also have amino acid changes around the active site, most commonly at positions 238 or 238 and 240. More than 60 SHV varieties are known. SHV-5 and SHV-12 are among the most common. The initials stand for "sulfhydryl reagent variable".

==== CTX-M beta-lactamases (class A) ====
These enzymes were named for their greater activity against cefotaxime than other oxyimino-beta-lactam substrates (e.g., ceftazidime, ceftriaxone, or cefepime). Rather than arising by mutation, they represent examples of plasmid acquisition of beta-lactamase genes normally found on the chromosome of Kluyvera species, a group of rarely pathogenic commensal organisms. These enzymes are not very closely related to TEM or SHV beta-lactamases in that they show only approximately 40% identity with these two commonly isolated beta-lactamases. More than 172 CTX-M enzymes are currently known. Despite their name, a few are more active on ceftazidime than cefotaxime. They are widely described among species of Enterobacteriaceae, mainly E. coli and K. pneumoniae. Detected in the 1980s they have since the early 2000s spread and are the now the predominant ESBL type in the world. They are generally clustred into five groups based on sequencing homologies; CTX-M-1, CTX-M-2, CTX-M-8, CTX-M-9 and CTX-M-25. CTX-M-15 (belonging to the CTX-M-1 cluster) is the most prevalent CTX-M-gene. An example of beta-lactamase CTX-M-15, along with ISEcp1, has been found to have transposed onto the chromosome of Klebsiella pneumoniae ATCC BAA-2146. The initials stand for "Cefotaxime-Munich".

==== OXA beta-lactamases (class D) ====
OXA beta-lactamases were long recognized as a less common but also plasmid-mediated beta-lactamase variety that could hydrolyze oxacillin and related anti-staphylococcal penicillins. These beta-lactamases differ from the TEM and SHV enzymes in that they belong to molecular class D and functional group 2d. The OXA-type beta-lactamases confer resistance to ampicillin and cephalothin and are characterized by their high hydrolytic activity against oxacillin and cloxacillin and the fact that they are poorly inhibited by clavulanic acid. Amino acid substitutions in OXA enzymes can also give the ESBL phenotype. While most ESBLs have been found in E. coli, K. pneumoniae, and other Enterobacteriaceae, the OXA-type ESBLs have been found mainly in P. aeruginosa. OXA-type ESBLs have been found mainly in Pseudomonas aeruginosa isolates from Turkey and France. The OXA beta-lactamase family was originally created as a phenotypic rather than a genotypic group for a few beta-lactamases that had a specific hydrolysis profile. Therefore, there is as little as 20% sequence homology among some of the members of this family. However, recent additions to this family show some degree of homology to one or more of the existing members of the OXA beta-lactamase family. Some confer resistance predominantly to ceftazidime, but OXA-17 confers greater resistance to cefotaxime and cefepime than it does resistance to ceftazidime.

==== Others ====
Other plasmid-mediated ESBLs, such as PER, VEB, GES, and IBC beta-lactamases, have been described but are uncommon and have been found mainly in P. aeruginosa and at a limited number of geographic sites. PER-1 in isolates in Turkey, France, and Italy; VEB-1 and VEB-2 in strains from Southeast Asia; and GES-1, GES-2, and IBC-2 in isolates from South Africa, France, and Greece. PER-1 is also common in multiresistant acinetobacter species in Korea and Turkey. Some of these enzymes are found in Enterobacteriaceae as well, whereas other uncommon ESBLs (such as BES-1, IBC-1, SFO-1, and TLA-1) have been found only in Enterobacteriaceae.

==== Treatment ====
While ESBL-producing organisms were previously associated with hospitals and institutional care, these organisms are now increasingly found in the community. CTX-M-15-positive E. coli are a cause of community-acquired urinary infections in the UK, and tend to be resistant to all oral β-lactam antibiotics, as well as quinolones and sulfonamides. Treatment options may include nitrofurantoin, fosfomycin, mecillinam and chloramphenicol. In desperation, once-daily ertapenem or gentamicin injections may also be used.

=== Inhibitor-resistant β-lactamases ===
Although the inhibitor-resistant β-lactamases are not ESBLs, they are often discussed with ESBLs because they are also derivatives of the classical TEM- or SHV-type enzymes. These enzymes were at first given the designation IRT for inhibitor-resistant TEM β-lactamase; however, all have subsequently been renamed with numerical TEM designations. There are at least 19 distinct inhibitor-resistant TEM β-lactamases. Inhibitor-resistant TEM β-lactamases have been found mainly in clinical isolates of E. coli, but also some strains of K. pneumoniae, Klebsiella oxytoca, P. mirabilis, and Citrobacter freundii. Although the inhibitor-resistant TEM variants are resistant to inhibition by clavulanic acid and sulbactam, thereby showing clinical resistance to the beta-lactam—lactamase inhibitor combinations of amoxicillin-clavulanate (co-amoxiclav), ticarcillin-clavulanate (co-ticarclav), and ampicillin/sulbactam, they normally remain susceptible to inhibition by tazobactam and subsequently the combination of piperacillin/tazobactam, although resistance has been described. This is no longer a primarily European epidemiology, it is found in northern parts of America often and should be tested for with complex UTI's.

=== AmpC-type β-lactamases (class C) ===
AmpC type β-lactamases are commonly isolated from extended-spectrum cephalosporin-resistant gram-negative bacteria. AmpC β-lactamases (also termed class C or group 1) are typically encoded on the chromosome of many gram-negative bacteria including Citrobacter, Serratia and Enterobacter species where its expression is usually inducible; it may also occur on Escherichia coli but is not usually inducible, although it can be hyperexpressed. AmpC type β-lactamases may also be carried on plasmids. AmpC β-lactamases, in contrast to ESBLs, hydrolyse broad and extended-spectrum cephalosporins (cephamycins as well as to oxyimino-β-lactams) but are not typically inhibited by the β-lactamase inhibitors clavulanic acid and tazobactam, whereas avibactam can maintain inhibitory activity against this class of β-lactamases. AmpC-type β-lactamase organisms are often clinically grouped through the acronym, "SPACE": Serratia, Pseudomonas or Proteus, Acinetobacter, Citrobacter, and Enterobacter.

== Carbapenemases ==
Carbapenems are famously stable to AmpC β-lactamases and extended-spectrum-β-lactamases. Carbapenemases are a diverse group of β-lactamases that are active not only against the oxyimino-cephalosporins and cephamycins but also against the carbapenems. Aztreonam is stable to the metallo-β-lactamases, but many IMP and VIM producers are resistant, owing to other mechanisms. Carbapenemases were formerly believed to derive only from classes A, B, and D, but a class C carbapenemase has been described.

=== IMP-type carbapenemases (metallo-β-lactamases) (class B) ===
Plasmid-mediated IMP-type carbapenemases (IMP stands for active-on-imipenem), 19 varieties of which are currently known, became established in Japan in the 1990s both in enteric gram-negative organisms and in Pseudomonas and Acinetobacter species. IMP enzymes spread slowly to other countries in the Far East, were reported from Europe in 1997, and have been found in Canada and Brazil.

=== VIM (Verona integron-encoded metallo-β-lactamase) (Class B) ===
A second growing family of carbapenemases, the VIM family, was reported from Italy in 1999 and now includes 10 members, which have a wide geographic distribution in Europe, South America, and the Far East and have been found in the United States. VIM-1 was discovered in P. aeruginosa in Italy in 1996; since then, VIM-2 - now the predominant variant - was found repeatedly in Europe and the Far East; VIM-3 and -4 are minor variants of VIM-2 and -1, respectively.

Amino acid sequence diversity is up to 10% in the VIM family, 15% in the IMP family, and 70% between VIM and IMP. Enzymes of both the families, nevertheless, are similar. Both are integron-associated, sometimes within plasmids. Both hydrolyse all β-lactams except monobactams, and evade all β-lactam inhibitors. The VIM enzymes are among the most widely distributed MBLs, with >40 VIM variants having been reported. Biochemical and biophysical studies revealed that VIM variants have only small variations in their kinetic parameters but substantial differences in their thermal stabilities and inhibition profiles.

=== OXA (oxacillinase) group of β-lactamases (class D) ===
The OXA group of β-lactamases occur mainly in Acinetobacter species and are divided into two clusters. OXA carbapenemases hydrolyse carbapenems very slowly in vitro, and the high MICs seen for some Acinetobacter hosts (>64 mg/L) may reflect secondary mechanisms. They are sometimes augmented in clinical isolates by additional resistance mechanisms, such as impermeability or efflux. OXA carbapenemases also tend to have a reduced hydrolytic efficiency towards penicillins and cephalosporins.

=== KPC (K. pneumoniae carbapenemase) (class A) ===
A few class A enzymes, most noted the plasmid-mediated KPC enzymes, are effective carbapenemases as well. Ten variants, KPC-2 through KPC-11 are known, and they are distinguished by one or two amino acid substitutions (KPC-1 was re-sequenced in 2008 and found to be 100% homologous to published sequences of KPC-2). KPC-1 was found in North Carolina, KPC-2 in Baltimore and KPC-3 in New York. They have only 45% homology with SME and NMC/IMI enzymes and, unlike them, can be encoded by self-transmissible plasmids.

As of February 2009, the class A Klebsiella pneumoniae carbapenemase (KPC) globally has been the most common carbapenemase, and was first detected in 1996 in North Carolina, USA. A 2010 publication indicated that KPC producing Enterobacteriaceae were becoming common in the United States.

=== CMY (class C) ===
The first class C carbapenemase was described in 2006 and was isolated from a virulent strain of Enterobacter aerogenes. It is carried on a plasmid, pYMG-1, and is therefore transmissible to other bacterial strains.

=== SME (Serratia marcescens enzymes), IMI (IMIpenem-hydrolysing β-lactamase), NMC and CcrA ===
In general, these enzymes are of limited clinical significance. CcrA (also known as CfiA) is encoded by a gene present in approximately 1–3% of Bacteroides fragilis isolates; however, only a subset express the enzyme, as expression generally requires activation by an upstream insertion sequence. CcrA-producing strains were identified prior to the clinical introduction of imipenem, and their prevalence has shown little subsequent increase.

=== NDM-1 (New Delhi metallo-β-lactamase) (class B) ===
Originally described from New Delhi in 2009, this gene is now widespread in Escherichia coli and Klebsiella pneumoniae from India and Pakistan. As of mid-2010, NDM-1 carrying bacteria have been introduced to other countries (including the United States and UK), most probably due to the large number of tourists travelling the globe, who may have picked up the strain from the environment, as strains containing the NDM-1 gene have been found in environmental samples in India. NDM have several variants which share different properties.

== Treatment of pathogens that produce ESBL/AmpC/carbapenemases ==
=== General overview ===
In general, an isolate is suspected to be an ESBL producer when it shows in vitro susceptibility to the cephamycins (cefoxitin, cefotetan) but resistance to the third-generation cephalosporins and to aztreonam. Moreover, one should suspect these strains when treatment with these agents for gram-negative infections fails despite reported in vitro susceptibility. Once an ESBL-producing strain is detected, the laboratory should report it as "resistant" to all penicillins, cephalosporins, and aztreonam, even if it is tested (in vitro) as susceptible. Associated resistance to aminoglycosides and trimethoprim-sulfamethoxazole, as well as high frequency of co-existence of fluoroquinolone resistance, creates problems. Beta-lactamase inhibitors such as clavulanate, sulbactam, and tazobactam in vitro inhibit most ESBLs, but the clinical effectiveness of beta-lactam/beta-lactamase inhibitor combinations cannot be relied on consistently for therapy. Cephamycins (cefoxitin and cefotetan) are not hydrolyzed by majority of ESBLs, but are hydrolyzed by associated AmpC-type β-lactamase. Also, β-lactam/β-lactamase inhibitor combinations may not be effective against organisms that produce AmpC-type β-lactamase. Sometimes these strains decrease the expression of outer membrane proteins, rendering them resistant to cephamycins. In vivo studies have yielded mixed results against ESBL-producing K. pneumoniae. (Cefepime, a fourth-generation cephalosporin, has demonstrated in vitro stability in the presence of many ESBL/AmpC strains.) Currently, carbapenems are, in general, regarded as the preferred agent for treatment of infections due to ESBL-producing organisms. Carbapenems are resistant to ESBL-mediated hydrolysis and exhibit excellent in vitro activity against strains of Enterobacteriaceae expressing ESBLs.

=== According to genes ===
==== ESBLs ====
Strains producing only ESBLs are susceptible to cephamycins and carbapenems in vitro and show little if any inoculum effect with these agents.

For organisms producing TEM and SHV type ESBLs, apparent in vitro sensitivity to cefepime and to piperacillin/tazobactam is common, but both drugs show an inoculum effect, with diminished susceptibility as the size of the inoculum is increased from 10^{5} to 10^{7} organisms.

Strains with some CTX-M–type and OXA-type ESBLs are resistant to cefepime on testing, despite the use of a standard inoculum.

==== Inhibitor-resistant β-lactamases ====
Although the inhibitor-resistant TEM variants are resistant to inhibition by clavulanic acid and sulbactam, thereby showing clinical resistance to the beta-lactam—beta lactamase inhibitor combinations of amoxicillin-clavulanate (Co-amoxiclav), ticarcillin-clavulanate, and ampicillin/sulbactam, they remain susceptible to inhibition by tazobactam and subsequently the combination of piperacillin/tazobactam.

==== AmpC ====
AmpC-producing strains are typically resistant to oxyimino-beta lactams and to cephamycins and are susceptible to carbapenems; however, diminished porin expression can make such a strain carbapenem-resistant as well.

==== Carbapenemases ====
Strains with IMP-, VIM-, and OXA-type carbapenemases usually remain susceptible. Resistance to non-beta-lactam antibiotics is common in strains making any of these enzymes, such that alternative options for non-beta-lactam therapy need to be determined by direct susceptibility testing. Resistance to fluoroquinolones and aminoglycosides is especially high.

=== According to species ===
==== Escherichia coli or Klebsiella ====
For infections caused by ESBL-producing Escherichia coli or Klebsiella species, treatment with imipenem or meropenem has been associated with the best outcomes in terms of survival and bacteriologic clearance. Cefepime and piperacillin/tazobactam have been less successful. Ceftriaxone, cefotaxime, and ceftazidime have failed even more often, despite the organism's susceptibility to the antibiotic in vitro. Several reports have documented failure of cephamycin therapy as a result of resistance due to porin loss. Some patients have responded to aminoglycoside or quinolone therapy, but, in a recent comparison of ciprofloxacin and imipenem for bacteremia involving an ESBL-producing K. pneumoniae, imipenem produced the better outcome

==== Pseudomonas aeruginosa ====
There have been few clinical studies to define the optimal therapy for infections caused by ESBL producing Pseudomonas aeruginosa strains.

== Use as a pharmaceutical ==
In 1957, amid concern about allergic reactions to penicillin-containing antibiotics, a beta-lactamase was sold as an antidote under the brand name neutrapen. It was theorized that the breakdown of penicillin by the enzyme would treat the allergic reaction. While it was not useful in acute anaphylactic shock, it showed positive results in cases of urticaria and joint pain suspected to be caused by penicillin allergy. Its use was proposed in pediatric cases where penicillin allergy was discovered upon administration of the polio vaccine, which used penicillin as a preservative. However, some patients developed allergies to neutrapen. The Albany Hospital removed it from its formulary in 1960, only two years after adding it, citing lack of use. Some researchers continued to use it in experiments on penicillin resistance as late as 1972. It was voluntarily withdrawn from the American market by 3M Pharmaceuticals in 1997.

== Detection ==
Beta-lactamase enzymatic activity can be detected using nitrocefin, a chromogenic cephalosporin substrate which changes color from yellow to red upon beta-lactamase mediated hydrolysis.

Extended spectrum beta lactamase (ESBL) screening can be performed using disk-diffusion. Cefpodoxime, ceftazidime, aztreonam, cefotaxime, and/or ceftriaxone discs are used.

== Evolution ==
Beta-lactamases are ancient bacterial enzymes. Metallo β-lactamases ("class B") are all structurally similar to RNase Z and may have evolved from it. Of the three subclasses B1, B2, and B3, B1 and B2 are theorized to have evolved about one billion years ago, while B3 seems to have arisen independently, possibly before the divergence of the gram-positive and gram-negative eubacteria about two billion years ago. PNGM-1 (Papua New Guinea Metallo-β-lactamase-1) has both metallo-β-lactamase (MBL) and tRNase Z activities, suggesting that PNGM-1 is thought to have evolved from a tRNase Z, and that the B3 MBL activity of PNGM-1 is a promiscuous activity and subclass B3 MBLs are thought to have evolved through PNGM-1 activity. Subclasses B1 and B3 has been further subdivided.

Serine beta-lactamases (classes A, C, and D) appear to have evolved from DD-transpeptidases, which are penicillin-binding proteins involved in cell wall biosynthesis, and as such are one of the main targets of beta-lactam antibiotics. These three classes show undetectable sequence similarity with each other, but can still be compared using structural homology. Groups A and D are sister taxa and group C diverged before A and D. These serine-based enzymes, like the group B betalactamases, are of ancient origin and are theorized to have evolved about two billion years ago.

The OXA group (in class D) in particular is theorized to have evolved on chromosomes and moved to plasmids on at least two separate occasions.

== Etymology ==
The "β" (beta) refers to the nitrogen's position on the second carbon in the ring. Lactam is a blend of lactone (from the Latin lactis, milk, since lactic acid was isolated from soured milk) and amide. The suffix -ase, indicating an enzyme, is derived from diastase (from the Greek diastasis, "separation"), the first enzyme discovered in 1833 by Payen and Persoz.

== See also ==
- β-lactamase inhibitor
- ESBL-producing E. coli
- Nitrocefin
- Antimicrobial resistance
