= Streptomyces humidus =

Scientific classification
- Domain: Bacteria
- Kingdom: Bacillati
- Phylum: Actinomycetota
- Class: Actinomycetes
- Order: Streptomycetales
- Family: Streptomycetaceae
- Genus: Streptomyces
- Species: S. humidus

Binomial name
- Streptomyces humidus Nakazawa and Shibata 1956

Type strain
- 23572, ATCC 12760, ATCC 23923, BCRC 13707, CBS 907.68, CCRC 13707, CGMCC 4.1910, DSM 40263, IFO 12877, IFO 3520, ISP 5263, JCM 4386, KCC S-0386, NBRC 12877, NRRL B-3172, NRRL-ISP 5263, RIA 1186, VKM Ac-1703

Species of bacterium

Streptomyces humidus is a bacterium species from the genus of Streptomyces which was isolated from soil in Japan. Streptomyces humidus produces cobalamine, dihydrostreptomycin and humidin.

== See also ==
- List of Streptomyces species
