= Cefalonium =

Chemical compound

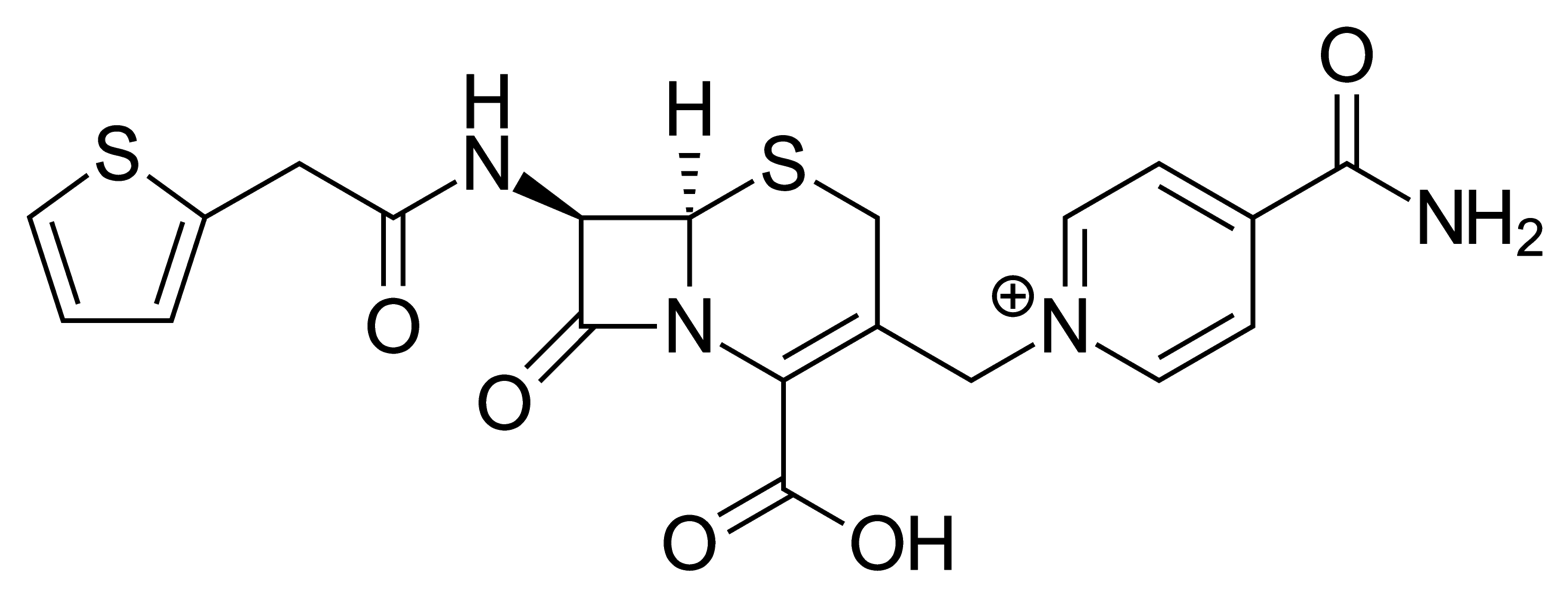

Clinical data
- AHFS/Drugs.com: International Drug Names
- ATCvet code: QJ51DB90 (WHO)

Legal status
- Legal status: Veterinary use only

Identifiers
- IUPAC name: (6R,7R)-3-[(4-carbamoylpyridin-1-ium-1-yl)methyl]-8-oxo-7-[(2-thiophen-2-ylacetyl)amino]-5-thia-1-azabicyclo[4.2.0]oct-2-ene-2-carboxylate
- CAS Number: 5575-21-3
- PubChem CID: 21743
- ChemSpider: 20438
- UNII: K2P920217W
- KEGG: D07634
- ChEMBL: ChEMBL2105567
- CompTox Dashboard (EPA): DTXSID5045388
- ECHA InfoCard: 100.024.499

Chemical and physical data
- Formula: C_{20}H_{18}N_{4}O_{5}S_{2}
- Molar mass: 458.51 g·mol^{−1}
- 3D model (JSmol): Interactive image
- SMILES: O=C2N1/C(=C(\CS[C@@H]1[C@@H]2NC(=O)Cc3sccc3)C[n+]4ccc(C(=O)N)cc4)C([O-])=O

Cefalonium (INN) is a first-generation cephalosporin antibiotic.
