= Pilabactam =

Investigational drug

Clinical data
- Other names: ANT3310

Identifiers
- IUPAC name: [(2R,5R)-2-fluoro-7-oxo-1,6-diazabicyclo[3.2.1]octan-6-yl] hydrogen sulfate
- CAS Number: 2410688-60-5
- PubChem CID: 146346770
- IUPHAR/BPS: 12795
- ChemSpider: 129449675
- UNII: M7P8J9YDG9
- ChEMBL: ChEMBL4802858

Chemical and physical data
- Formula: C_{6}H_{9}FN_{2}O_{5}S
- Molar mass: 240.21 g·mol^{−1}
- 3D model (JSmol): Interactive image
- SMILES: C1C[C@H](N2C[C@@H]1N(C2=O)OS(=O)(=O)O)F
- InChI: InChI=InChI=1S/C6H9FN2O5S/c7-5-2-1-4-3-8(5)6(10)9(4)14-15(11,12)13/h4-5H,1-3H2,(H,11,12,13)/t4-,5+/m1/s1; Key:GCKKZLXJSUOGES-UHNVWZDZSA-N

Pilabactam is an beta-lactamase inhibitor that is being evaluated by Antabio as an antiinfective.

== Chemistry ==
The first in class non-β-lactam β-lactamase inhibitor avibactam contains a strained urea functional group within the diazabicyclooctane (DBO) ring system. This strained urea acts as a warhead that reacts with the active site serine residue in β-lactamases. Other drugs in this class include relebactam, durlobactam, nacubactam and zidebactam. However none of these are active against carbapenem-resistant Acinetobacter baumannii. (CRAB). Pilabactam contains a fluorine atom that replaces a carboxamide group in the other DBOs and restores CRAB sensitivity.

== See also ==
- Diazabicyclooctane β-lactamase inhibitor
