= Imipenem/cilastatin/relebactam =

Combination drug

Combination of
- Imipenem: β-Lactam antibiotic
- Cilastatin: Dehydropeptidase inhibitor
- Relebactam: β-Lactamase inhibitor

Clinical data
- Trade names: Recarbrio
- Other names: MK-7655A
- AHFS/Drugs.com: Monograph
- MedlinePlus: a619046
- License data: US DailyMed: Recarbrio
- Routes of administration: Intravenous
- ATC code: J01DH56 (WHO)

Legal status
- Legal status: CA: ℞-only; US: ℞-only; EU: Rx-only; In general: ℞ (Prescription only)

Identifiers
- CAS Number: 2446322-18-3
- KEGG: D11621

Imipenem/cilastatin/relebactam, sold under the brand name Recarbrio, is a fixed-dose combination medication used as an antibiotic. It is administered via intravenous injection.

The most common adverse reactions include nausea, diarrhea, headache, fever and increased liver enzymes. The most common adverse reactions observed in people treated for hospital-acquired bacterial pneumonia and ventilator-associated bacterial pneumonia (HABP/VABP) include increased aspartate/alanine aminotransferases (increased liver enzymes), anemia, diarrhea, hypokalemia (low potassium), and hyponatremia (low sodium).

In 2019, it was approved for use in the United States for the treatment of complicated urinary tract and complicated intra-abdominal infections.

== Medical uses ==
In the United States, imipenem/cilastatin/relebactam is indicated for the treatment of people with complicated urinary tract infections and complicated intra-abdominal infections who have limited or no alternative treatment options. It is also indicated to treat hospital-acquired bacterial pneumonia and ventilator-associated bacterial pneumonia HABP/VABP in people aged 18 years of age and older.

In the European Union, it is indicated for the treatment of infections due to aerobic Gram-negative organisms in adults with limited treatment options.

== Antimicrobial activity ==
Imipenem/cilastatin/relebactam has improved activity against P. aeruginosa with decreased porins expression and/or overproducing β-lactamases of the category "AmpC", thanks to relebactam AmpC inhibition. Imipenem/cilastatin/relebactam maintains a limited activity against blaOXA-48-expressing carbapenem-resistant Enterobacterales, and has no activity against metallo-β-lactamase-producing isolates. Relebactam has no activity against OXA class D β-lactamases of A. baumannii. For susceptibility testing purposes, the concentration of relebactam is fixed at 4 mg/L. The European Committee on Antimicrobial Susceptibility Testing (EUCAST) provided a susceptibility clinical breakpoint of ≤2 mg/L for Enterobacterales, P. aeruginosa, and Acinetobacter spp., while The Clinical & Laboratory Standards Institute (CLSI) provided a susceptibility clinical breakpoint of ≤1 mg/L for Enterobacterales and ≤2 mg/L for P. aeruginosa.

== Pharmacokinetic properties ==
Imipenem/cilastatin/relabactam is an hydrophilic compound. The distribution of imipenem/relebactam is prevalent in the interstitial spaces. Protein binding is 20% for imipenem, 20% for cilastatin and 22% for relebactam; volume of distribution is 24.3 L for imipenem and cilastatin and 19 L for relebactam. The two drugs achieve relatively high concentrations in the respiratory system: the exposure in epithelial lining fluid, relative to that of unbound concentrations in plasma, is 55% for imipenem and 54% for relebactam. Both imipenem and relebactam have renal clearance and a half-life of approximately 1 h. Dose adjustment should be performed in renal impairment.

== History ==
The application for imipenem/cilastatin/relebactam was granted Qualified Infectious Disease Product (QIDP), fast track, and priority review designations by the U.S. Food and Drug Administration (FDA). The FDA granted the approval of Recarbrio to Merck & Co., Inc.

The determination of efficacy of imipenem/cilastatin/relebactam was supported in part by the findings of the efficacy and safety of imipenem-cilastatin for the treatment of complicated urinary tract infections (cUTI) and complicated intra-abdominal infections (cIAI). The contribution of relebactam to imipenem/cilastatin/relebactam was assessed based on data from in vitro studies and animal models of infection. The safety of imipenem/cilastatin/relebactam, administered via injection, was studied in two trials (Trial 1/NCT01505634, Trial 2/NCT01506271), one each for cUTI and cIAI. The cUTI trial included 298 adult participants with 99 treated with the proposed dose of imipenem/cilastatin/relebactam. The cIAI trial included 347 participants with 117 treated with the proposed dose of imipenem/cilastatin/relebactam.

Trial 1 enrolled adult participants hospitalized with cUTI. Trial 2 enrolled adult participants hospitalized with cIAI that required surgery or drainage. In both trials, participants were assigned to either imipenem/cilastatin with varying doses of relebactam or imipenem/cilastatin with placebo intravenously, every 6 hours for 4 to 14 days. Neither the participants nor the investigators knew which treatment was being given until after the trial was completed. The trials were conducted in Europe, South America, the United States, Asia Pacific, Africa, and Mexico.

It was approved for use in the European Union in February 2020.

In June 2020, imipenem/cilastatin/relebactam was approved for the indication to treat hospital-acquired bacterial pneumonia and ventilator-associated bacterial pneumonia (HABP/VABP) in adults 18 years of age and older.

The safety and efficacy of imipenem/cilastatin/relebactam for the treatment of HABP/VABP were evaluated in a randomized, controlled clinical trial of 535 hospitalized adults with HABP/VABP due to Gram-negative bacteria (a type of bacteria) in which 266 participants were treated with imipenem/cilastatin/relebactam and 269 participants were treated with piperacillin-tazobactam, another antibacterial drug. Overall, 16% of participants who received imipenem/cilastatin/relebactam and 21% of participants who received piperacillin-tazobactam died through day 28 of the study.

In September 2026, Merck withdrew it from the US market.

== See also ==
- Imipenem/cilastatin
