= Meropenem/vaborbactam =

Combination antibiotic drug

Combination of
- Meropenem: Beta-lactam antibiotic
- Vaborbactam: Beta-lactamase inhibitor

Clinical data
- Trade names: Vabomere, Vaborem, others
- AHFS/Drugs.com: Monograph
- License data: US DailyMed: Meropenem vaborbactam
- Routes of administration: Intravenous
- ATC code: J01DH52 (WHO)

Legal status
- Legal status: CA: ℞-only; US: ℞-only; EU: Rx-only

Identifiers
- CAS Number: 2031124-72-6
- KEGG: D11015

Meropenem/vaborbactam, sold under the brand name Vabomere among others, is a combination medication used to treat complicated urinary tract infections, complicated abdominal infections, and hospital-acquired pneumonia. It contains meropenem, a beta-lactam antibiotic; and vaborbactam, a beta-lactamase inhibitor. It is given by injection into a vein.

Common side effects include headache, inflammation at the site of injection, nausea, diarrhea, liver inflammation, and low blood potassium. Severe side effects may include anaphylaxis, seizures, and Clostridioides difficile-associated diarrhea. It is unclear if use during pregnancy is safe. Meropenem works by blocking the construction of the bacterial cell wall while vaborbactam blocks the breakdown of meropenem by some beta-lactamases.

The combination was approved for medical use in the United States in 2017, in the European Union in 2018, and in Canada in December 2024. It is on the World Health Organization's List of Essential Medicines.

== Medical uses ==
It is used to treat complicated urinary tract infections, complicated abdominal infections, and hospital-acquired pneumonia.

== Side effects ==
The most common adverse reactions were headache, infusion site reactions and diarrhea. Serious risks include allergic reactions and seizures and Meropenem/vaborbactam should not be used in people with severe allergic reactions to penicillins.

== Antimicrobial activity ==
Meropenem/vaborbactam retains antimicrobial activity against class A and class C β-lactamase-producing Enterobacterales, especially those producing ESBL, KPC, and AmpC determinants. Meropenem/vaborbactam is also active against strains of Enterobacterales producing other types of class A serine carbapenemases (e.g. SME and NMC-A enzymes). Resistance to meropenem/vaborbactam in KPC-producing Enterobacterales is currently very rare and mostly due to porin inactivation. Meropenem/vaborbactam retains activity also against strains producing KPC mutants that confer resistance to ceftazidime/avibactam (e.g., KPC-8, KPC-31). The activity of meropenem/vaborbactam against P. aeruginosa and A. baumannii was found to be similar to that of meropenem alone. In fact, in these species, meropenem resistance is largely mediated by mechanisms that are not antagonized by vaborbactam (e.g., outer-membrane impermeability, upregulation of efflux systems, and production of class B or class D β-lactamases). No antimicrobial activity has been reported for MBL-producing Gram-negatives and OXA-48-producing Enterobacterales.

== History ==
In a study of 545 adults with complicated urinary tract infections, 98 percent of adults treated with meropenem/vaborbactam compared with about 94 percent of adults treated with piperacillin/tazobactam were cured defined as improvement in symptoms and a negative urine culture. About seven days after completing treatment, roughly 77 percent of adults treated with Vabomere compared with about 73 percent of those treated with piperacillin/tazobactam had resolved symptoms and a negative urine culture.

In August 2017, the US Food and Drug Administration approved the combination to treat complicated urinary tract infections and pyelonephritis.

== Research ==
Successful bacteremia clearance in a child has been reported using a meropenem-vaborbactam dose of 40 mg/kg every 6 hours given over 3 hours. It attained 100% of meropenem serum concentrations above the minimum inhibitory concentration for at least 40% of the dosing interval.
