= Nacubactam =

Chemical compound

Pharmacokinetic data
- Protein binding: 1–2%
- Elimination half-life: about 2–3 hours
- Excretion: Kidney (76–91% unchanged)

Identifiers
- IUPAC name: [(2S,5R)-2-(2-aminoethoxycarbamoyl)-7-oxo-1,6-diazabicyclo[3.2.1]octan-6-yl] hydrogen sulfate
- CAS Number: 1452458-86-4
- PubChem CID: 73386748
- DrugBank: DB15353
- ChemSpider: 58827979
- UNII: 832O37V7MZ
- KEGG: D11329
- ChEMBL: ChEMBL3989959

Chemical and physical data
- Formula: C_{9}H_{16}N_{4}O_{7}S
- Molar mass: 324.31 g·mol^{−1}
- 3D model (JSmol): Interactive image
- SMILES: C1C[C@H](N2C[C@@H]1N(C2=O)OS(=O)(=O)O)C(=O)NOCCN
- InChI: InChI=InChI=1S/C9H16N4O7S/c10-3-4-19-11-8(14)7-2-1-6-5-12(7)9(15)13(6)20-21(16,17)18/h6-7H,1-5,10H2,(H,11,14)(H,16,17,18)/t6-,7+/m1/s1; Key:RSBPYSTVZQAADE-RQJHMYQMSA-N

Nacubactam (development codes OP0595 and RG6080) is an investigational β-lactamase inhibitor being developed for the treatment of infections caused by multidrug-resistant Gram-negative bacteria, in particular carbapenem-resistant Enterobacteriaceae (CRE). It is given intravenously together with a β-lactam antibiotic, such as cefepime or aztreonam. It belongs to the diazabicyclooctane (DBO) class of compounds, like avibactam and relebactam, but unlike them it also has its own antibacterial activity. In 2026 a phase 3 trial showed that cefepime–nacubactam was more effective than imipenem/cilastatin in complicated urinary tract infections.

== Mechanism of action ==
Many bacteria resist β-lactam antibiotics by producing β-lactamases, enzymes that break the antibiotic down. Nacubactam blocks the serine β-lactamases of Ambler classes A and C and some of class D, thereby protecting the partner antibiotic. In addition, it binds penicillin-binding protein 2 (PBP2) in Enterobacteriaceae. This gives it a modest antibacterial effect of its own and makes the partner β-lactam work better, an effect described as "β-lactam enhancement".

== Spectrum of activity ==
In laboratory studies, combinations of nacubactam with cefepime, aztreonam or meropenem are active against Enterobacterales producing extended-spectrum β-lactamases (ESBLs), AmpC enzymes and KPC carbapenemases. Activity against the OXA-48 carbapenemase is weaker than that of avibactam. Nacubactam does not inhibit metallo-β-lactamases (such as NDM and VIM). However, the aztreonam–nacubactam combination often remains active against these strains because aztreonam is not broken down by metallo-β-lactamases, while nacubactam protects it from the other enzymes the bacteria produce. Activity against Pseudomonas aeruginosa is lower than against Enterobacterales, and nacubactam combinations are not active against Acinetobacter baumannii. Resistance has so far been reported only rarely.

== Pharmacokinetics ==
Nacubactam is given by intravenous infusion. It is almost not bound to plasma proteins (about 1–2%), has an elimination half-life of roughly 2–3 hours in healthy adults, and is removed mainly unchanged by the kidneys, with very little metabolism by the liver. Because of this, its levels in the blood rise markedly in people with reduced kidney function, and dose adjustment is expected to be needed. Haemodialysis removes most of the drug. It reaches the fluid lining the lungs, and no relevant interactions were found with meropenem, cefepime, aztreonam or piperacillin.

== Clinical trials ==
The efficacy of nacubactam has been tested in two phase 3 trials. In Integral-1, a double-blind randomised trial in 431 adults with complicated urinary tract infection or acute pyelonephritis, combined clinical and microbiological success was achieved in 82% of patients treated with cefepime–nacubactam, 72% with aztreonam–nacubactam and 61% with imipenem/cilastatin. Cefepime–nacubactam was superior to imipenem/cilastatin, while aztreonam–nacubactam met the criterion for non-inferiority. Integral-2 compared the two nacubactam combinations with the best available therapy in adults with infections due to CRE, including urinary, intra-abdominal and hospital-acquired lung infections. The trial has been completed, but as of 2026 its results had not been published.

Earlier studies in animal models of infection supported the dosing used in these trials.

== Safety ==
In studies in healthy volunteers, nacubactam alone or with meropenem was generally well tolerated at single doses up to 8 g. The most common side effects were irritation of the vein at the infusion site, nausea and headache, with no clinically relevant effects on kidney function or on the QT interval. Studies in China and Japan gave similar results. Data in elderly people, the group most exposed to multidrug-resistant infections, are lacking.
