= Cefepime/zidebactam =

Combination antibiotic

Combination of
- Cefepime: Cephalosporin antibacterial
- Zidebactam: Beta-lactamase inhibitor and non-beta-lactam antibacterial

Clinical data
- Trade names: Zaynich
- AHFS/Drugs.com: Monograph
- License data: US DailyMed: Cefepime and zidebactam
- Routes of administration: Intravenous
- ATC code: J01DE51 (WHO)

Legal status
- Legal status: US: ℞-only

Identifiers
- KEGG: D13313

Cefepime/zidebactam, sold under the brand name Zaynich, is a fixed-dose combination used for the treatment of complicated urinary tract infections. It contains cefepime, a cephalosporin antibacterial; and zidebactam, a beta-lactamase inhibitor and non-beta-lactam antibacterial.

It was approved for medical use in the United States in May 2026.

== Background ==
Cefepime/zidebactam was developed by Mumbai-based company Wockhardt in India.

== Medical uses ==
Cefepime/zidebactam is indicated for the treatment of adults with complicated urinary tract infections including pyelonephritis caused by designated susceptible microorganisms.

== Society and culture ==
=== Legal status ===
Cefepime/zidebactam was approved for medical use in the United States in May 2026.

=== Names ===
Cefepime/zidebactam is sold under the brand name Zaynich.
