= Diazabicyclooctane β-lactamase inhibitor =

- Drug class
- Avibactam is the founding member of this class

Class identifiers
- Use: In combination with β-lactam antibiotics, treatment of infections caused by multidrug-resistant Gram-negative bacteria,
- Mechanism of action: inhibitor
- Biological target: β-Lactamase
- Chemical class: Diazabicyclooctane

Legal status

A diazabicyclooctane β-lactamase inhibitor is a novel class of β-lactamase inhibitors (BLIs) that contain a strained urea functional group imbedded within the diazabicyclooctane (DBO) ring system. This strained urea acts as a warhead that reacts with the active site serine residue in β-lactamases. The main use of this class of BLIs is to restore β-lactam antibiotic activity against resistant Gram-negative bacteria when it is co-administered.

Avibactam is the founding member of this class of drugs. Other drugs in this class include durlobactam, nacubactam, pilabactam, pralurbactam, relebactam, and zidebactam.
