= Epidemiology of pneumonia =

Analysis of the spread of pneumonia

Age-standardized death from lower respiratory tract infections per 100,000 inhabitants in 2004.: no data <100 100-700 700-1400 1400-2100 2100-2800 2800-3500 / 3500-4200 4200-4900 4900-5600 5600-6300 6300-7000 >7000

Pneumonia is a common respiratory infection, affecting approximately 450 million people a year and occurring in all parts of the world. It is a major cause of death among all age groups, resulting in 1.4 million deaths in 2010 (7% of the world's yearly total) and 3.0 million deaths in 2016 (the 4th leading cause of death in the world).

There are various causes of pneumonia including bacteria, viruses, and fungi. Pneumonia can be acquired from different sources such as in hospitals, the community, or through use of ventilators.

Pneumonia is a type of lower respiratory tract infection, and is also the most deadly communicable disease as of 2016. Rates are greatest in children less than five and adults older than 75 years of age. It occurs about five times more frequently in the developing world versus the developed world. South Asia and Sub-Saharan Africa have the highest prevalence of pneumonia in the world.

Pneumonia can be prevented and treated through vaccines, proper treatments, and healthy practices.

== Hospital-acquired pneumonia ==
Hospital-acquired pneumonia is pneumonia that is acquired in a hospital setting at least 48 hours after being admitted. Pneumonia is the second most common hospital-acquired disease, while also being the leading cause of death among hospital-acquired infections. Hospital-acquired pneumonia is also seen to be the cause for nearly half of all the antibiotics taken within hospitals worldwide.

A sub-type of hospital-acquired pneumonia, known as ventilator-associated pneumonia, is described as pneumonia acquired more than 48 hours after an endotracheal intubation procedure was performed. It is also seen to be the most common infection in intensive care units (ICUs), making up around 70-80% of the cases of hospital-acquired pneumonia in ICUs. The primary pathogen that can cause hospital-acquired pneumonia is dependent on the geographical location but overall, it was found that the six most common bacteria that caused most hospital-acquired pneumonia cases were S. aureus, P. aeruginosa, Klebsiella species, E. coli, Acinetobacter species, and Enterobacter species. While the majority of these pathogens are bacteria, it is possible for multiple pathogens to infect at once and cause pneumonia.

== Community-acquired pneumonia ==
Community acquired pneumonia is the source of most pneumonia cases and is categorized as cases of pneumonia developed outside of the hospital or medical facilities. Community acquired pneumonia is one of the leading causes of hospitalization due to an infectious agent. Streptococcus pneumoniae bacteria, a type of typical agent, cause about 50% of this form of pneumonia. Respiratory viruses and atypical bacteria are also responsible for causing many cases of community acquired pneumonia. Older age, history of smoking, and having comorbidities are major risk factors for contracting community acquired pneumonia.

There is estimated to be an incidence rate of 1.5 to 14 cases of community-acquired pneumonia per 1000 person-years across the globe. Location, demographics, and seasons all affect the incidence rates of community acquired pneumonia.

== Children ==
In 2008, pneumonia occurred in approximately 156 million children (151 million in the developing world and 5 million in the developed world). It caused 1.6 million deaths or 28–34% of all deaths in those under five years of age of which 95% occurred in the developing world. However, in recent years due to improvements in prevention and treatment of pneumonia, the number of cases in children under the age of five has decreased from 178 million in 2000 to 138 million in 2015, and mortality rates decreasing from 1.7 million in 2000 to 921,000 in 2015 worldwide. Out of all deaths of children age five and under in 2017, pneumonia was the cause of 15%, killing more children than any other infectious disease. In 2015, around 2,400 children under the age of 5 died of pneumonia per day. Countries with the greatest burden of disease include: India (43 million), China (21 million) and Pakistan (10 million).

Children in developing countries are at a significantly higher risk for developing pneumonia because malnutrition, overcrowding, and the lack of proper housing are prevalent risk factors. Other illnesses can also worsen the chances of developing pneumonia, such as malaria, which is commonly seen in Africa and South Asia. Overall, the most determining risk factors for developing pneumonia among children in developing countries are age and the season. Children under 1 year of age are more at risk, and children overall are more at risk during rainy/wet seasons. S. pneumoniae appears to be the most prominent cause of infection, although it's unclear as to whether bacterial and viral co-infection plays a larger role in infecting children.

It is the leading cause of death among children in low income countries. Many of these deaths occur in the newborn period. The World Health Organization estimates that one in three newborn infant deaths are due to pneumonia. Approximately half of these cases and deaths are theoretically preventable, being caused by the bacteria for which an effective vaccine is available.

== Europe ==
Each year, Europe suffers from 230,000 deaths caused by pneumonia. Community acquired pneumonia causes more deaths in Europe than any other single infectious agent. Community acquired pneumonia has an incidence rate of 1.7-11.6 cases per 1000 people each year in Europe. The rates of community acquired pneumonia vary by country, but there is an estimated one million people hospitalized in Europe due to this condition per year. Hospital acquired pneumonia has an incidence rate of about .05-2% and has the highest mortality rates of any infection.

=== United Kingdom ===
In the United Kingdom, the annual incidence rate of pneumonia is approximately 6 cases per 1000 people in individuals aged 18–39 years. For those over 75 years of age, the incidence rate rises to 75 cases per 1000 people. Roughly 20–40% of individuals who contract pneumonia require hospital admission, with between 5–15% of these admitted to a critical care unit. The case fatality rate in the UK is around 5–10%.

=== Poland ===
In 2014, Poland had a pediatric population of 7,367,100, and had an incidence rate of 930 per 100,000 hospitalized with pneumonia. Out of the total number of hospitalized children, 81.8% were ages five and under, with the average age being 3.25 years. Children under the age of six were five times more likely to be hospitalized than those ages six and above. While being hospitalized, 19 pneumonia-related deaths occurred, and within three months of being released from the hospital, an additional 117 children died.

== North America ==
=== United States ===
As the eighth leading cause of death in the United States, pneumonia has an annual incidence rate of 24.8 cases per 10,000 adults. In 2011, pneumonia was the second-most common reason for hospitalization in the U.S., with approximately 1.1 million stays—a rate of 36 stays per 10,000 population. For every 1,000 persons, 7.9 visited an emergency department in the United States between the years of 2016 and 2018 due to pneumonia.

The most frequent cause of hospitalization for US children is pneumonia, with an incidence rate of 15.7 per 10,000 children. US children less than two years of age had the highest rate, with 62.2 per 10,000 children. Every year, there are about 124,000 hospitalizations of US children with community-acquired pneumonia.

Pneumonia was one of the top ten most expensive conditions seen during inpatient hospitalizations in the U.S. in 2011, with an aggregate cost of nearly $10.6 billion for 1.1 million stays. In 2012, a study of Medicaid-covered and uninsured hospital stays in the United States in 2012, pneumonia was the second most common diagnosis for Medicaid-covered and uninsured hospital stays in the United States (behind mood disorders, at 3.7% for Medicaid stays and 2.4% for uninsured stays).

== Africa ==
Africa has the second highest incidence rate of pneumonia of children under five years old at 0.33 episodes per child per year. In 2015, pneumonia was responsible for the deaths of 473,000 African children under the age of five years old. A third of African children do not receive the antibiotics needed to treat the infection which could prevent pneumonia deaths caused by bacteria. In Sub-Saharan Africa, there is an estimated four million cases and 200,000 deaths in adult populations per year.

== Asia ==
Incidence rates of childhood pneumonia (under five years old) are greatest in South East Asia with 0.36 episodes per child per year. In the South East Asian region, there is an estimated 61 million cases of pneumonia in children under five per year, and it is attributed to 19% of the region's total childhood deaths. Due to the lack of surveillance in this region, an accurate prevalence rate of pneumonia can be hard to produce. There is not a reliable set of data on the incidence or death rates among adult populations in Asia.

=== Korea ===
Korea has a high rate of pneumonia, with about 30% of its population being treated every year. In 2018, the third leading cause of death in Korea was pneumonia. Those ages 0–14 have the highest hospitalization rate due to bacterial pneumonia, with the total hospitalization rate being 79.1 per 10,000 persons. The pneumonia death rate in Korea has been on the rise. In 2013, the death rate was 21.4 per 100,000, an increase from 5.7 per 100,000 in 2003. About 1.34 million people in South Korea had pneumonia in 2018, with the prevalence being highest in children younger than ten years of age.

== Demographics and risk factors ==
More cases of community acquired pneumonia occur during the winter months than at other times of the year. Pneumonia occurs more commonly in males than in females, and more often among Blacks than Caucasians, partly due to quantitative differences in synthesizing Vitamin D after exposure to sunlight.

Individuals with underlying chronic illnesses, such as Alzheimer's disease, cystic fibrosis, emphysema, and immune system problems as well as tobacco smokers, alcoholics, and individuals who are hospitalized for any reason, are at significantly increased risk of contracting and having repeated bouts of pneumonia.

Environmental factors such as indoor air pollution, exposure to smoke, and crowded living conditions increase susceptibility to contracting pneumonia.

A retrospective time-series study performed in Hong Kong found that hospitalizations for pneumonia among children were significantly higher during and following periods of very hot or cool outdoor temperatures when compared with periods of more moderate temperatures.

== Prevention and treatments ==
A protect, prevent, and treat plan has been created by WHO and UNICEF as an intervention strategy for dealing with pneumonia worldwide. This intervention includes promoting breastfeeding combined with sufficient complementary feeding, vaccinations, proper hygiene/handwashing techniques, managing air pollution indoors, preventing and treating HIV, and providing adequate healthcare to treat the infection such as through antibiotics and oxygen.

Prevention is the best way to keeping this disease dormant and those who acquire it healthy from symptoms. Vaccinations are the best way to prevent the spread of disease and minimize symptoms of the disease. It is recommended that those who are at risk to acquiring the disease should be vaccinated.

Treatment is dependent on what type of pneumonia is presented:

- Bacterial
- Viral

=== Bacterial Pneumonia Treatment ===
The treatment options for bacterial pneumonia is antibiotic therapy. Dependent on the severity of the case some may require hospitalization, especially when risk factors may make one more susceptible. The typical antibiotics prescribed to treat community and hospital acquired pneumonia is amoxicillin plus a macrolide. It is said that if one is suspected of pneumonia to begin treatments within four hours of symptoms and diagnosis.

=== Viral Pneumonia Treatment ===
There is no treatment options for viral pneumonia as antibiotics don't work for combating this strand of the disease. With treatment of viral pneumonia they use more supportive care such as rest, supplemental oxygen sources, staying hydrated, and keeping cold like symptoms at a minimum.
