= Pralurbactam =

Clinical data
- Other names: FL058

Legal status
- Legal status: investigational

Identifiers
- IUPAC name: [(2S,5R)-2-[2-(diaminomethylideneamino)oxyethoxycarbamoyl]-7-oxo-1,6-diazabicyclo[3.2.1]octan-6-yl] hydrogen sulfate
- CAS Number: 2163782-59-8
- PubChem CID: 155048066
- IUPHAR/BPS: 13037
- DrugBank: DB19437
- ChemSpider: 128921637
- UNII: GTP46AY74R
- ChEBI: CHEBI:759183
- ChEMBL: ChEMBL5314477

Chemical and physical data
- Formula: C_{10}H_{18}N_{6}O_{8}S
- Molar mass: 382.35 g·mol^{−1}
- 3D model (JSmol): Interactive image
- SMILES: C1C[C@H](N2C[C@@H]1N(C2=O)OS(=O)(=O)O)C(=O)NOCCON=C(N)N
- InChI: InChI=InChI=1S/C10H18N6O8S/c11-9(12)14-23-4-3-22-13-8(17)7-2-1-6-5-15(7)10(18)16(6)24-25(19,20)21/h6-7H,1-5H2,(H,13,17)(H4,11,12,14)(H,19,20,21)/t6-,7+/m1/s1; Key:HOJIPBUGHMYVQD-RQJHMYQMSA-N

Pralurbactam is an investigational new drug that is being evaluated by Qilu Pharmaceutical for the treatment of hospital-acquired bacterial pneumonia (HAP) and ventilator-associated bacterial pneumonia (VAP). It is a DBO class β-lactamase inhibitor that is co-administered with β-lactam antibiotics to overcome bacterial resistance to the later.

== Clinical trials ==
Pralurbactam is in phase 3 clinical trials for HAP and VAP.
