= Ceftazidime/avibactam =

Combination antibiotic medication

Combination of
- Ceftazidime: Cephalosporin antibiotic
- Avibactam: β-lactamase inhibitor

Clinical data
- Trade names: Avycaz, Zavicefta, others
- AHFS/Drugs.com: Monograph
- MedlinePlus: a615018
- License data: US DailyMed: Ceftazidime avibactam
- Pregnancy category: AU: B3
- Routes of administration: Intravenous infusion
- ATC code: J01DD52 (WHO)

Legal status
- Legal status: AU: S4 (Prescription only); US: ℞-only; EU: Rx-only

Identifiers
- CAS Number: 1393723-27-7
- PubChem CID: 90643431
- KEGG: D10779

Ceftazidime/avibactam, sold under the brand name Avycaz (by AbbVie) among others, is a fixed-dose combination medication composed of ceftazidime, a cephalosporin antibiotic, and avibactam, a β-lactamase inhibitor. It is used to treat complicated intra-abdominal infections, urinary tract infections, and pneumonia. It is only recommended when other options are not appropriate. It is given by infusion into a vein.

Common side effect include nausea, fever, liver problems, headache, trouble sleeping, and pain at the site of infusion. Severe side effects may include anaphylaxis, seizures, and Clostridioides difficile-associated diarrhea. While use appears to be safe in pregnancy the medication has not been well studied in this group. Doses should be adjusted in those with kidney problems. Ceftazidime works by interfering with the building of the bacterial cell wall while avibactam works by preventing ceftazidime's breakdown.

The combination was approved for medical use in the United States and the European Union in 2015. It is on the World Health Organization's List of Essential Medicines. Resistances are increasingly been reported with United States, Greece and Italy accounting for 80% of cases.

== Medical use ==
Ceftazidime/avibactam is used to treat certain multidrug-resistant gram-negative infections.

Ceftazidime/avibactam is used for the treatment of:

- complicated intra-abdominal infections. In these cases it is often used in combination with metronidazole, which provides coverage for anaerobic pathogens.
- complicated urinary tract infections, including acute pyelonephritis, in adults.
- hospital-acquired bacterial pneumonia and ventilator-associated bacterial pneumonia.

=== Bacterial activity ===
For many bacterial infections, it offers little or no advantage over ceftazidime monotherapy, due to the widespread expression of resistance mechanisms other than β-lactamase production. These include Haemophilus, Moraxella and Neisseria pathogens, and infections caused by Acinectobacter baumannii.

The antibacterial spectrum of ceftazidime/avibactam includes nearly all Enterobacteriaceae, including ceftazidime-resistant strains. The activity of ceftazidime/avibactam against the important hospital pathogen Pseudomonas aeruginosa is variable, due to the potential presence of other resistance mechanisms in addition to β-lactamase production. Synergy was observed for avibactam with ceftazidime in Burkholderia infections.

== Adverse events ==
When used to treat life-threatening infections, ceftazidime/avibactam is more likely than carbapenem antibiotics to cause serious adverse events, including worsening kidney function and gastrointestinal adverse effects.

== Mechanism of action ==
Bacterial resistance to cephalosporins is often due to bacterial production of β-lactamase enzymes that deactivate these antibiotics. Avibactam inhibits some (but not all) bacterial β-lactamases. Also, some bacteria are resistant to cephalosporins by other mechanisms, and therefore avibactam doesn't work. Avibactam is not active against New Delhi metallo-β-lactamase 1 (NDM-1). Avibactam inhibits Klebsiella pneumoniae carbapenemases (KPCs), and AmpC-type β-lactamases, which are resistant to the other clinically available β-lactamases, tazobactam and clavulanic acid.

== Regulatory ==
It was granted approval for marketing in the United States by the Food and Drug Administration (FDA) in February 2015. It was granted approval for marketing in Europe by the European Medicines Agency in 2016. During its clinical development, ceftazidime/avibactam was designated as a Qualified Infectious Disease Product under the Generating Antibiotic Incentives Now provision of the Food and Drug Administration Safety and Innovation Act. Development of ceftazidime/avibactam was fast-tracked by the FDA due to the shortage of drugs for treatment of infections due to antibiotic-resistant bacteria.
