= Durlobactam =

Medication

Clinical data
- Other names: ETX2514
- License data: US DailyMed: Durlobactam
- Routes of administration: Intravenous
- Drug class: Antibacterial, beta-lactamase inhibitor
- ATC code: None

Legal status
- Legal status: US: ℞-only co-packaged with sulbactam

Identifiers
- IUPAC name: [(2S,5R)-2-carbamoyl-3-methyl-7-oxo-1,6-diazabicyclo[3.2.1]oct-3-en-6-yl] hydrogen sulfate
- CAS Number: 1467829-71-5
- PubChem CID: 89851852
- DrugBank: DB16704; DBSALT003190
- ChemSpider: 57617784; 71060725
- UNII: PSA33KO9WA; F78MDZ9CW9
- KEGG: D11591; D11592
- ChEMBL: ChEMBL4298137; ChEMBL4297378

Chemical and physical data
- Formula: C_{8}H_{11}N_{3}O_{6}S
- Molar mass: 277.25 g·mol^{−1}
- 3D model (JSmol): Interactive image
- SMILES: CC1=C[C@@H]2C[N@]([C@@H]1C(N)=O)C(=O)N2OS(O)(=O)=O
- InChI: InChI=1S/C8H11N3O6S/c1-4-2-5-3-10(6(4)7(9)12)8(13)11(5)17-18(14,15)16/h2,5-6H,3H2,1H3,(H2,9,12)(H,14,15,16)/t5-,6+/m1/s1; Key:BISPBXFUKNXOQY-RITPCOANSA-N

Durlobactam is a beta-lactamase inhibitor used in combination with sulbactam to treat susceptible strains of bacteria in the genus Acinetobacter It is an analog of avibactam.

The combination therapy sulbactam/durlobactam was approved for medical use in the United States in May 2023.

== See also ==
- Diazabicyclooctane β-lactamase inhibitor
- ETX0462
