= Sulbactam/durlobactam =

Combination medication

Combination of
- Sulbactam: beta-lactam antibacterial, beta-lactamase inhibitor
- Durlobactam: beta-lactamase inhibitor

Clinical data
- Trade names: Xacduro
- License data: US DailyMed: Sulbactam and durlobactam
- Routes of administration: Intravenous
- ATC code: None

Legal status
- Legal status: US: ℞-only

Identifiers
- KEGG: D12605

Sulbactam/durlobactam, sold under the brand name Xacduro (by Innoviva Specialty Therapeutics), is a co-packaged medication used for the treatment of bacterial pneumonia caused by Acinetobacter baumannii-calcoaceticus complex. It contains sulbactam, a beta-lactam antibacterial and beta-lactamase inhibitor; and durlobactam, a beta-lactamase inhibitor.

Sulbactam/durlobactam was approved for medical use in the United States in May 2023.

== Medical uses ==
Sulbactam/durlobactam is indicated for the treatment of hospital-acquired bacterial pneumonia and ventilator-associated bacterial pneumonia, caused by susceptible isolates of Acinetobacter baumannii-calcoaceticus complex.

== History ==
The efficacy of sulbactam/durlobactam was established in a multicenter, active-controlled, open-label (investigator-unblinded, assessor-blinded), non-inferiority clinical trial in 177 hospitalized adults with pneumonia caused by carbapenem-resistant A. baumannii. Participants received either sulbactam/durlobactam or colistin (a comparator antibiotic) for up to 14 days. Both treatment arms also received an additional antibiotic, imipenem/cilastatin, as background therapy for potential hospital-acquired bacterial pneumonia/ventilator-associated bacterial pneumonia pathogens other than Acinetobacter baumannii-calcoaceticus complex. The primary measure of efficacy was mortality from all causes within 28 days of treatment in participants with a confirmed infection with carbapenem-resistant A. baumannii. Of those who received sulbactam/durlobactam, 19% (12 of 63 participants) died, compared to 32% (20 of 62 participants) who received colistin; this demonstrated that sulbactam/durlobactam was noninferior to colistin.

== Resistances ==
Overall, 2.3% of Acinetobacter baumannii strains are resistant to sulbactam/durlobactam. This percentage increases to 3.4% and 3.7% in the subgroups of carbapenem-resistant and colistin-resistant Acinetobacter, respectively. In Acinetobacter strains producing metallo-beta-lactamases, sulbactam/durlobactam resistance is 100%.

== Society and culture ==
=== Legal status ===
Sulbactam/durlobactam was approved for medical use in the United States in May 2023. The FDA granted the application for sulbactam/durlobactam fast track and priority review designations.
