= Taniborbactam =

Clinical data
- Other names: VNRX-5133, VNRX5133

Legal status
- Legal status: Investigational

Identifiers
- IUPAC name: (3R)-3-[[2-[4-(2-Aminoethylamino)cyclohexyl]acetyl]amino]-2-hydroxy-3,4-dihydro-1,2-benzoxaborinine-8-carboxylic acid
- CAS Number: 1613267-49-4
- PubChem CID: 76902493
- ChemSpider: 115037173
- UNII: 8IGQ156Z07
- KEGG: D11718
- ChEMBL: ChEMBL4463697

Chemical and physical data
- Formula: C_{19}H_{28}BN_{3}O_{5}
- Molar mass: 389.26 g·mol^{−1}
- 3D model (JSmol): Interactive image
- SMILES: O=C(O)C1=CC=CC2=C1OB(O)[C@@H](NC(C[C@@H]3CC[C@@H](NCCN)CC3)=O)C2
- InChI: InChI=InChI=1S/C19H28BN3O5/c21-8-9-22-14-6-4-12(5-7-14)10-17(24)23-16-11-13-2-1-3-15(19(25)26)18(13)28-20(16)27/h1-3,12,14,16,22,27H,4-11,21H2,(H,23,24)(H,25,26)/t12?,14?,16-/m0/s1; Key:PFZUWUXKQPRWAL-PXCJXSSVSA-N

Taniborbactam (development code VNRX-5133) is a pharmaceutical drug that acts as a β-lactamase inhibitor. It inhibits the function of bacterial β-lactamases which impart resistance to β-lactam antibiotics. However, unlike other β-lactamase inhibitors that are used as pharmaceuticals, taniborbactam is effective against enzymes of the New Delhi metallo-beta-lactamase 1 group which are the most frequently identified sources of acquired antibiotic resistance worldwide.

Taniborbactam, in combination with cefepime, is in clinical trials for the treatment of bacterial infections, including urinary tract infection and pyelonephritis.
