= Funobactam =

Chemical compound

Clinical data
- Other names: XNW-4107

Legal status
- Legal status: Investigational

Identifiers
- IUPAC name: [(2S,5R)-2-[5-[(5S)-2-amino-4,5-dihydro-1H-imidazol-3-ium-5-yl]-1,3,4-oxadiazol-2-yl]-7-oxospiro[1,6-diazabicyclo[3.2.1]octane-4,1'-cyclopropane]-6-yl] sulfate
- CAS Number: 2365454-12-0
- PubChem CID: 164888918
- IUPHAR/BPS: 13114
- ChemSpider: 128921712
- UNII: 6WG7OYL77A

Chemical and physical data
- Formula: C_{13}H_{17}N_{7}O_{6}S
- Molar mass: 399.38 g·mol^{−1}
- 3D model (JSmol): Interactive image
- SMILES: C1CC12C[C@H](N3C[C@@H]2N(C3=O)OS(=O)(=O)[O-])C4=NN=C(O4)[C@@H]5C[NH+]=C(N5)N
- InChI: InChI=1S/C13H17N7O6S/c14-11-15-4-6(16-11)9-17-18-10(25-9)7-3-13(1-2-13)8-5-19(7)12(21)20(8)26-27(22,23)24/h6-8H,1-5H2,(H3,14,15,16)(H,22,23,24)/t6-,7-,8-/m0/s1; Key:GRRBXZJDEZJMHA-FXQIFTODSA-N

Funobactam is an investigational new drug that is being evaluated for the treatment of hospital-acquired bacterial pneumonia. It is a β-lactamase inhibitor.
