= Unplanned extubation =

Removal of a patient's endotracheal tube at an inappropriate time

An unplanned extubation occurs when a patient is on mechanical ventilation and their endotracheal tube is removed when it was not supposed to be. If the patient themselves intentionally removes their own tube, this is known as self-extubation or deliberate unplanned extubation, whereas if the tube is removed by health professionals, or a patient removes it by accident, it is referred to as accidental extubation. Estimates of the incidence of unplanned extubation among patients in intensive care units range from 3.4% to 22.5%. Unplanned extubation can increase the amount of time a patient must remain on mechanical ventilation, the duration of the patient's hospital stay, and the patient's medical costs. It is also estimated that 60% of patients who experience an unplanned extubation require re-intubation, which may increase the risk of ventilator-associated pneumonia.

Unplanned extubation is most commonly associated with patient agitation and ICU delirium, which are considered major risk factors for self-extubation. Studies suggest that agitation accounts for a substantial proportion of cases, and between 40% and 60% of patients who experience unplanned extubation require re-intubation. Re-intubation has been linked to longer durations of mechanical ventilation, increased intensive care unit length of stay, higher healthcare costs, and elevated risk of complications such as hypoxemia and ventilator-associated pneumonia. Because of these risks, prevention strategies often include physical restraints, sedation, and continuous monitoring, though each approach carries its own clinical and ethical challenges.
