= Zidebactam =

Clinical data
- License data: US DailyMed: Zidebactam

Legal status
- Legal status: Investigational

Identifiers
- IUPAC name: [(2S,5R)-7-oxo-2-[[[(3R)-piperidine-3-carbonyl]amino]carbamoyl]-1,6-diazabicyclo[3.2.1]octan-6-yl] hydrogen sulfate
- CAS Number: 1436861-97-0
- PubChem CID: 77846445
- DrugBank: DB13090
- ChemSpider: 44209501
- UNII: YPM97423DB
- KEGG: D13311
- ChEMBL: ChEMBL4533605

Chemical and physical data
- Formula: C_{13}H_{21}N_{5}O_{7}S
- Molar mass: 391.40 g·mol^{−1}
- 3D model (JSmol): Interactive image
- SMILES: C1C[C@H](CNC1)C(=O)NNC(=O)[C@@H]2CC[C@@H]3CN2C(=O)N3OS(=O)(=O)O
- InChI: InChI=1S/C13H21N5O7S/c19-11(8-2-1-5-14-6-8)15-16-12(20)10-4-3-9-7-17(10)13(21)18(9)25-26(22,23)24/h8-10,14H,1-7H2,(H,15,19)(H,16,20)(H,22,23,24)/t8-,9-,10+/m1/s1; Key:YCZPXRQPDCXTIO-BBBLOLIVSA-N

Zidebactam (WCK-5107) is an antibiotic adjuvant drug which acts as a beta-lactamase inhibitor, preventing the breakdown of other antibiotic drugs.

== See also ==
- Cefepime
- Diazabicyclooctane β-lactamase inhibitor
