= Aztreonam/avibactam =

Combination antibiotic medication

Combination of
- Aztreonam: Monobactam antibacterial
- Avibactam: Beta-lactamase inhibitor

Clinical data
- Trade names: Emblaveo
- AHFS/Drugs.com: Monograph
- MedlinePlus: a625054
- License data: US DailyMed: Aztreonam and avibactam
- Routes of administration: Intravenous
- ATC code: None

Legal status
- Legal status: UK: POM (Prescription only); US: ℞-only; EU: Rx-only

Identifiers
- KEGG: D12889

Aztreonam/avibactam, sold under the brand name Emblaveo, is a fixed-dose combination antibacterial medication used for the treatment of aerobic Gram-negative infections. It was developed by AbbVie and Pfizer, and is a combination of aztreonam, a monobactam antibacterial, and avibactam, a non-beta-lactam beta-lactamase inhibitor.

The combination was approved for medical use in the European Union in April 2024, in the United Kingdom in June 2024, and in the United States in February 2025.

== Medical uses ==
In the EU and the UK, aztreonam/avibactam is indicated for the treatment of complicated intra-abdominal infection; hospital-acquired pneumonia, including ventilator-associated pneumonia; or complicated urinary tract infection, including pyelonephritis. It is also indicated for the treatment of infections due to aerobic Gram-negative organisms in adults with limited treatment options. Aztreonam/avibactam is administered as an intravenous infusion.

In the US, aztreonam/avibactam, in combination with metronidazole, is indicated in people aged 18 years of age and older who have limited or no alternative options for the treatment of complicated intra-abdominal infections including those caused by the following susceptible gram-negative microorganisms: Escherichia coli, Klebsiella pneumoniae, Klebsiella oxytoca, Enterobacter cloacae complex, Citrobacter freundii complex, and Serratia marcescens.

== Society and culture ==
=== Legal status ===
In March 2024, the Committee for Medicinal Products for Human Use (CHMP) of the European Medicines Agency (EMA) adopted a positive opinion, recommending the granting of a marketing authorization for the medicinal product Emblaveo, intended for the treatment of complicated intra-abdominal and urinary tract infections, hospital-acquired pneumonia and infections due to aerobic Gram-negative organisms in people with limited treatment options. The applicant for this medicinal product is Pfizer Europe MA EEIG. The combination was approved for medical use in the European Union in April 2024.

The Food and Drug Administration (FDA) approved Emblaveo in February 2025 largely based on the results of the Phase III open-label randomized REVISIT trial.
