= Sulbactam =

Chemical compound

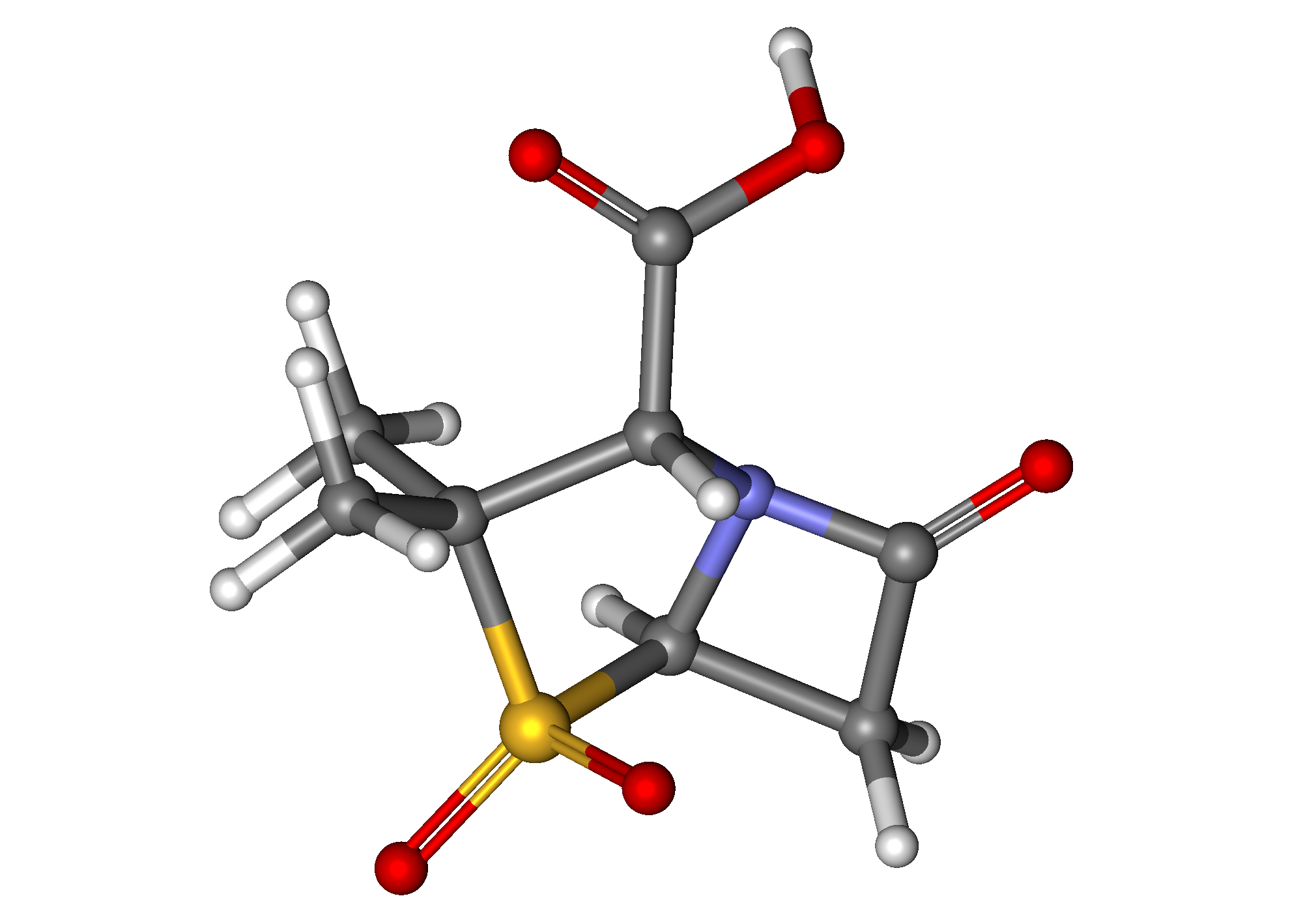

Clinical data
- AHFS/Drugs.com: International Drug Names
- MedlinePlus: a693021
- License data: US DailyMed: Sulbactam
- Routes of administration: Intravenous, intramuscular
- ATC code: J01CG01 (WHO)

Legal status
- Legal status: UK: POM (Prescription only)

Pharmacokinetic data
- Protein binding: 29%
- Elimination half-life: 0.65–1.20 hrs
- Excretion: Mainly kidneys (41–66% within 8 hrs)

Identifiers
- IUPAC name: (2S,5R)-3,3-Dimethyl-7-oxo-4-thia-1-azabicyclo[3.2.0]heptane-2-carboxylic acid 4,4-dioxide
- CAS Number: 68373-14-8
- PubChem CID: 130313
- ChemSpider: 115306
- UNII: S4TF6I2330
- KEGG: D08533
- ChEBI: CHEBI:9321
- ChEMBL: ChEMBL403
- CompTox Dashboard (EPA): DTXSID1023605
- ECHA InfoCard: 100.063.506

Chemical and physical data
- Formula: C_{8}H_{11}NO_{5}S
- Molar mass: 233.24 g·mol^{−1}
- 3D model (JSmol): Interactive image
- Melting point: 148 to 151 °C (298 to 304 °F)
- SMILES: O=S2(=O)C([C@@H](N1C(=O)C[C@H]12)C(=O)O)(C)C
- InChI: InChI=1S/C8H11NO5S/c1-8(2)6(7(11)12)9-4(10)3-5(9)15(8,13)14/h5-6H,3H2,1-2H3,(H,11,12)/t5-,6+/m1/s1; Key:FKENQMMABCRJMK-RITPCOANSA-N

Sulbactam is a β-lactamase inhibitor. This drug is given in combination with β-lactam antibiotics to inhibit β-lactamase, an enzyme produced by bacteria that destroys the antibiotics.

It was patented in 1977 and approved for medical use in 1986.

== Medical uses ==
The combination ampicillin/sulbactam (Unasyn) is available in the United States.

The combination cefoperazone/sulbactam (Sulperazon) is available in many countries but not in the United States.

The co-packaged combination sulbactam/durlobactam was approved for medical use in the United States in May 2023.

== Mechanism ==
Sulbactam is primarily used as a suicide inhibitor of β-lactamase, shielding more potent beta-lactams such as ampicillin. Sulbactam itself contains a beta-lactam ring, and has weak antibacterial activity by inhibiting penicillin binding proteins (PBP) 1 and 3, but not 2.
