= Relebactam =

Chemical compound

Clinical data
- Other names: MK-7655
- License data: US DailyMed: Relebactam

Legal status
- Legal status: US: ℞-only

Identifiers
- IUPAC name: [(2S,5R)-7-Oxo-2-(piperidin-4-ylcarbamoyl)-1,6-diazabicyclo[3.2.1]octan-6-yl] hydrogen sulfate
- CAS Number: 1174018-99-5
- PubChem CID: 44129647
- DrugBank: DB12377
- ChemSpider: 31137585
- UNII: 1OQF7TT3PF

Chemical and physical data
- Formula: C_{12}H_{20}N_{4}O_{6}S
- Molar mass: 348.37 g·mol^{−1}
- 3D model (JSmol): Interactive image
- SMILES: C1C[C@H](N2C[C@@H]1N(C2=O)OS(=O)(=O)O)C(=O)NC3CCNCC3
- InChI: InChI=1S/C12H20N4O6S/c17-11(14-8-3-5-13-6-4-8)10-2-1-9-7-15(10)12(18)16(9)22-23(19,20)21/h8-10,13H,1-7H2,(H,14,17)(H,19,20,21)/t9-,10+/m1/s1; Key:SMOBCLHAZXOKDQ-ZJUUUORDSA-N

Relebactam is a chemical compound used in combination with antibiotics to improve their efficacy. As a beta-lactamase inhibitor, it blocks the ability of bacteria to break down a beta-lactam antibiotic. In the United States, relebactam is approved for use in the combination imipenem/cilastatin/relebactam (Recarbrio by Merck).

== See also ==
- Avibactam
- Diazabicyclooctane β-lactamase inhibitor
