= Arbekacin =

Antibiotic

Clinical data
- Trade names: Habekacin
- AHFS/Drugs.com: International Drug Names
- Routes of administration: Intramuscular, intravenous
- Drug class: Aminoglycoside antibiotic
- ATC code: J01GB12 (WHO)

Legal status
- Legal status: In general: ℞ (Prescription only)

Pharmacokinetic data
- Metabolism: minimal
- Excretion: Renal

Identifiers
- IUPAC name: (2S)-4-Amino-N-[(1R,2S,3S,4R,5S)-5-amino-4-[(2R,3R,6S)-3-amino-6-(aminomethyl)oxan-2-yl]oxy-2-[(2S,3R,4S,5S,6R)-4-amino-3,5-dihydroxy-6-(hydroxymethyl)oxan-2-yl]oxy-3-hydroxycyclohexyl]-2-hydroxybutanamide
- CAS Number: 51025-85-5
- PubChem CID: 68682
- DrugBank: DB06696
- ChemSpider: 9573665
- UNII: G7V6SLI20L
- KEGG: D07462
- ChEMBL: ChEMBL426926
- PDB ligand: 84G (PDBe, RCSB PDB)
- CompTox Dashboard (EPA): DTXSID8048319

Chemical and physical data
- Formula: C_{22}H_{44}N_{6}O_{10}
- Molar mass: 552.626 g·mol^{−1}
- 3D model (JSmol): Interactive image
- SMILES: C1C[C@H]([C@H](O[C@@H]1CN)O[C@@H]2[C@H](C[C@H]([C@@H]([C@H]2O)O[C@@H]3[C@@H]([C@H]([C@@H]([C@H](O3)CO)O)N)O)NC(=O)[C@H](CCN)O)N)N
- InChI: InChI=InChI=1S/C22H44N6O10/c23-4-3-12(30)20(34)28-11-5-10(26)18(37-21-9(25)2-1-8(6-24)35-21)17(33)19(11)38-22-16(32)14(27)15(31)13(7-29)36-22/h8-19,21-22,29-33H,1-7,23-27H2,(H,28,34)/t8-,9+,10-,11+,12-,13+,14-,15+,16+,17-,18+,19-,21+,22+/m0/s1; Key:MKKYBZZTJQGVCD-XTCKQBCOSA-N

Arbekacin (INN) is a semisynthetic aminoglycoside antibiotic which was derived from kanamycin. It is primarily used for the treatment of infections caused by multi-resistant bacteria including methicillin-resistant Staphylococcus aureus (MRSA). Arbekacin was originally synthesized from dibekacin in 1973 by Hamao Umezawa and collaborators. It has been registered and marketed in Japan since 1990 under the trade name Habekacin. Arbekacin is no longer covered by patent and generic versions of the drug are also available under such trade names as Decontasin and Blubatosine.

== Pharmacology ==
Arbekacin is approved for the treatment of pneumonia and sepsis caused by methicillin-resistant Staphylococcus aureus (MRSA). Because of its synergistic effect with beta-lactams, arbekacin also holds promise as a treatment for multidrug-resistant Gram-negative bacterial infections such as multidrug-resistant Pseudomonas aeruginosa and Acinetobacter baumannii.

=== Pharmacodynamics ===
Aminoglycosides such as arbekacin work by binding to the bacterial 30S ribosomal subunit, causing misreading of tRNA which consequently, leaves the bacterium unable to synthesize proteins vital to its growth. Energy is needed for aminoglycoside uptake into the bacterial cell. Anaerobes have less energy available for this uptake, so aminoglycosides are less active against anaerobes.

=== Mechanism of action ===
Aminoglycosides such as arbekacin inhibit protein synthesis in susceptible bacteria by irreversibly binding to the bacterial 30S ribosomal subunit. Specifically, arbekacin binds to four nucleotides of 16S rRNA and a single amino acid of protein S12. This interferes with the decoding site in the vicinity of nucleotide 1400 in the 16S rRNA component of the 30S subunit. This region interacts with the wobble base in the anticodon of tRNA. This leads to misreading of mRNA, so incorrect amino acids are inserted into the polypeptide, leading to nonfunctional or toxic peptides and the breakup of polysomes into nonfunctional monosomes.

=== Absorption ===
Aminoglycosides are not well absorbed from the gastrointestinal tract, so they are typically administered parenterally.

=== Toxicity ===
Ototoxicity and nephrotoxicity are the most serious adverse effects of aminoglycoside therapy and are more likely to occur in patients with a history of renal impairment or who are receiving other ototoxic and/or nephrotoxic drugs. Normal duration of intramuscular or intravenous aminoglycoside therapy is 7–10 days, though longer treatment is sometimes necessary. Toxicity is more likely to occur when aminoglycoside treatment is continued for longer than 10 days.
