= Cilastatin =

Chemical compound

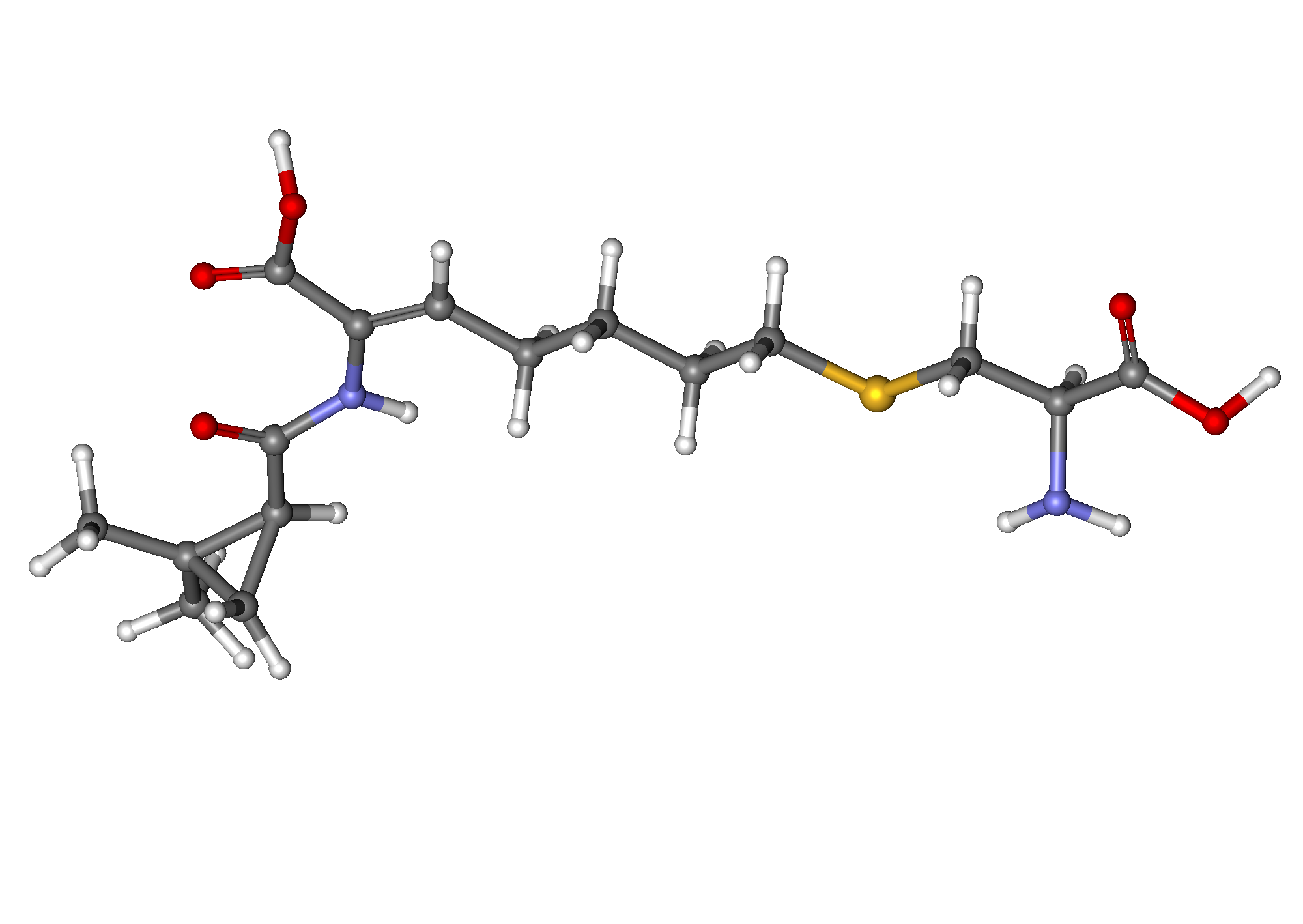

Clinical data
- AHFS/Drugs.com: International Drug Names
- MedlinePlus: a686013
- Routes of administration: Intravenous
- ATC code: J01DH51 (WHO) (combination with imipenem)

Identifiers
- IUPAC name: (Z)-7-[(2R)-2-Amino-3-hydroxy-3-oxopropyl]sulfanyl-2-{[(1S)-2,2-dimethylcyclopropanecarbonyl]amino}hept-2-enoic acid
- CAS Number: 82009-34-5
- PubChem CID: 5280454
- IUPHAR/BPS: 5166
- DrugBank: DB01597
- ChemSpider: 4940183
- UNII: 141A6AMN38
- KEGG: D07698
- ChEBI: CHEBI:3697
- ChEMBL: ChEMBL766
- CompTox Dashboard (EPA): DTXSID8048238
- ECHA InfoCard: 100.072.592

Chemical and physical data
- Formula: C_{16}H_{26}N_{2}O_{5}S
- Molar mass: 358.45 g·mol^{−1}
- 3D model (JSmol): Interactive image
- SMILES: O=C(N\C(=C/CCCCSC[C@@H](C(=O)O)N)C(=O)O)[C@H]1CC1(C)C
- InChI: InChI=1S/C16H26N2O5S/c1-16(2)8-10(16)13(19)18-12(15(22)23)6-4-3-5-7-24-9-11(17)14(20)21/h6,10-11H,3-5,7-9,17H2,1-2H3,(H,18,19)(H,20,21)(H,22,23)/b12-6-/t10-,11+/m1/s1; Key:DHSUYTOATWAVLW-WFVMDLQDSA-N

Cilastatin inhibits the human enzyme dehydropeptidase.

Cilastatin is a therapeutic alternative on the World Health Organization's List of Essential Medicines.

== Uses ==
Dehydropeptidase is an enzyme found in the kidney and is responsible for degrading the antibiotic imipenem. Cilastatin can therefore be combined intravenously with imipenem in order to protect it from degradation, prolonging its antibacterial effect.

Imipenem alone is an effective antibiotic and can be given without cilastatin. Cilastatin itself does not have antibiotic activity, although it has been proved to be active against a zinc-dependent beta-lactamase that usually confers antibiotic resistance to certain bacteria, more precisely, the carbapenem family of antibiotics. This property is due to the physicochemical similarities between membrane dipeptidase (MDP), the compound it is usually set to target, and the bacterial metallo-beta-lactamase carried by the CphA gene. The combination allows the antibiotic to be more effective by changing the pharmacokinetics involved. Thus imipenem/cilastatin, like amoxicillin/clavulanic acid, is a commonly used combination product.
