= Imipenem/cilastatin =

Combination antibiotic medication

Combination of
- Imipenem: Carbapenem antibiotic
- Cilastatin: Dehydropeptidase inhibitor

Clinical data
- Trade names: Primaxin, Tienam, Cilasafe, others
- AHFS/Drugs.com: Monograph
- MedlinePlus: a605011
- Routes of administration: IV, IM
- ATC code: J01DH51 (WHO)

Legal status
- Legal status: UK: POM (Prescription only); US: ℞-only

Identifiers
- CAS Number: 64221-86-9; 82009-34-5
- PubChem CID: 11954222
- ChemSpider: 21106325
- UNII: Q20IM7HE75; 141A6AMN38
- ChEMBL: ChEMBL296854
- CompTox Dashboard (EPA): DTXSID90872430

Imipenem/cilastatin, sold under the brand name Primaxin among others, is an antibiotic useful for the treatment of a number of bacterial infections. It is made from a combination of imipenem and cilastatin. Specifically it is used for pneumonia, sepsis, endocarditis, joint infections, intra-abdominal infections, and urinary tract infections. It is given by injection into a vein or muscle.

Common side effects include nausea, diarrhea, and pain at the site of injection. Other side effects may include Clostridioides difficile diarrhea and allergic reactions including anaphylaxis. It is unclear if use during pregnancy is safe for the baby. Imipenem is in the carbapenem family of medications and works by interfering with the bacteria's cell wall. Cilastatin blocks the activity of dehydropeptidase I which prevents the breakdown of imipenem.

Imipenem/cilastatin was first sold in 1987. It is on the World Health Organization's List of Essential Medicines.

== Medical uses ==
Imipenem/cilastatin is used for lower respiratory tract infections, urinary tract infections, intra-abdominal infections, gynecologic infections, bacterial sepsis, bone and joint infections, skin and skin structure infections, endocarditis and polymicrobic infections.

It is a broad-spectrum beta-lactam containing equal quantities of imipenem and cilastatin.

== Side effects ==
Common side effects for both forms are:

- Upset stomach
- Vomiting
- Stomach pain

Major side effects requiring medical attention:

- Diarrhea
- Rash
- Fever
- Facial swelling
- Difficulty breathing
- Unusual bleeding
- Seizures

This medicine is passed through breast milk, so its use during pregnancy or breastfeeding should only be done when clearly needed. Primaxin is cleared from the body by the kidneys, so it is important to tell one's doctor about any other drugs being taken that are also cleared through the kidneys (such as other antibiotics), especially for older patients, as kidney function declines with age.

Patients who are allergic to penicillin, cephalosporins, and related drugs may react to imipenem. It is important tell one's doctor or pharmacist one's medical history, especially of brain disorders (e.g., seizures, head injury, tumor), kidney disease, liver disease, and stomach/intestinal diseases (e.g., colitis).

=== Hepatotoxicity ===
In large clinical trials, imipenem was associated with transient and asymptomatic elevations in serum aminotransferase levels in about 6% of patients given the drug for five to 14 days. More serious hepatic injury from imipenem/cilastatin is rare, but jaundice and liver test abnormalities have been reported in 0.1% of patients in prospective trials of the agent. Several instances of cholestatic jaundice arising during or shortly after therapy have been reported with imipenem-cilastatin and other carbapenems. The latency to onset has been within one to three weeks, and the pattern of enzyme elevations is usually cholestatic. Immunoallergic features can occur, but autoantibodies are rare. The course is usually self-limiting, but at least one case of vanishing bile duct syndrome related to the carbapenems has been reported. Imipenem and other carbapenems have not been linked to cases of acute liver failure.

=== Mechanism of liver injury ===
The cause of the mild, transient serum enzyme elevations during imipenem-cilastatin therapy is not known. The cholestatic hepatitis attributed to imipenem-cilastatin and the carbapenems is probably immunoallergic and resembles the rare, clinically apparent liver injury that has been linked to penicillins and cephalosporins.

=== Outcome and management ===
The liver injury due to the carbapenems is usually mild and self-limited. Rarely, the carbapenems can cause a clinically apparent acute cholestatic hepatitis that is usually self-limiting and not requiring therapy or intervention. In patients with vanishing bile duct syndrome, corticosteroids are often used but have not been shown to be beneficial and are best avoided. Some patients may benefit from symptomatic therapy of the pruritus associated with cholestasis using antihistamines, ursodiol, or cholestyramine. Little information is available on possible cross-sensitivity to liver injury among the different betalactam antibiotics, but patients with clinically apparent liver injury due to imipenem should probably avoid the other carbapenems.

== Interactions ==
- valproic acid (Depakene, Stavzor)
- ganciclovir (Cytovene)
- probenecid (Benemid)
- penicillin antibiotics such as amoxicillin (Amoxil, Augmentin), ampicillin (Omnipen, Principen), dicloxacillin (Dycill, Dynapen), oxacillin (Bactocill), or phenoxymethylpenicillin (Beepen-VK, Ledercillin VK, Pen-V, Pen-Vee K, Pfizerpen, V-Cillin K, Veetids, and others); or
- cephalosporin antibiotics such as cefaclor (Ceclor), cefuroxime (Ceftin), cefadroxil (Duricef), cephalexin (Keflex), and others.

== Mechanism of action ==
Imipenem/cilastatin has the ability to kill a wide variety of bacteria. Imipenem is the active antibiotic agent and works by interfering with their ability to form cell walls, so the bacteria break up and die.

Imipenem is rapidly degraded by the renal enzyme dehydropeptidase if administered alone (making it less effective); the metabolites can cause kidney damage. Imipenem is a broad-spectrum betalactam antibiotic used for severe bacterial infections caused by susceptible organisms. Because imipenem is rapidly inactivated by renal dehydropeptidase I, it is given in combination with cilastatin, a DHP-I inhibitor which increases half-life and tissue penetration of imipenem. Imipenem/cilastatin, like other carbapenems, binds to bacterial penicillin-binding proteins and interferes with bacterial cell wall integrity and synthesis. It has activity against many aerobic and anaerobic Gram-positive and Gram-negative organisms, including Staphylococcus aureus, Streptococcus pyogenes, S. agalactiae, S. viridans- group streptococci, Enterococcus faecalis, Pseudomonas aeruginosa, Escherichia coli, Proteus mirabilis, Bacteroides fragilis and Peptostreptococcus species. Imipenem/cilastatin was approved for use in the United States in 1985. Imipenem/cilastatin is indicated for the treatment of severe or complicated skin, tissue, joint, respiratory tract, intra-abdominal, urinary tract and urogenital infections, but not meningitis (as it does not pass through the blood brain barrier), endocarditis, and sepsis due to susceptible organisms. Its use is generally restricted to severe infections largely in hospitalized patients. The recommended dosage is 250 mg to 1 gram given intravenously every 6 to 8 hours or in intramuscular doses of no more than 1.5 gm daily, usually for five to 14 days. It is commercially available as Primaxin as 250-mg or 500-mg infusion bottles for IV use or 500-mg or 750-mg vials of lyophilized powder for IM injection. The most common side effects of imipenem are diarrhea, nausea, vomiting, skin rash, pruritus, and injection-site reactions.

== Pharmacology ==
=== Mechanism of action ===
Imipenem inhibits bacterial cell-wall synthesis by binding to penicillin-binding proteins; cilastatin prevents renal metabolism of imipenem.

=== Bioavailability ===
Intramuscular injection:

- imipenem: 60–75%
- cilastatin: 95–100%

=== Distribution ===
The drug is distributed rapidly and widely to most tissues and fluids, including sputum, pleural fluid, peritoneal fluid, interstitial fluid, bile, aqueous humor, reproductive organs, and bone; highest concentrations occur in pleural fluid, interstitial fluid, peritoneal fluid, and reproductive organs; low concentrations occur in CSF; it crosses the placenta, and enters breast milk

=== Protein binding ===
- imipenem: 13–21%
- cilastatin, 40%

=== Metabolism ===
Imipenem is metabolized in the kidney by dehydropeptidase 1; activity is blocked by cilastatin.

=== Elimination ===
Half-life (both drugs): 60 min; prolonged with renal impairment. Excretion (both drugs): Urine (~70% as unchanged drug)

== Availability and description ==
Primaxin IV is a combination of imipenem, cilastatin sodium, and sodium bicarbonate which is added as a buffer. Primaxin IM lacks the sodium bicarbonate buffer.

== See also ==
- Imipenem/cilastatin/relebactam
