= Avibactam =

Chemical compound

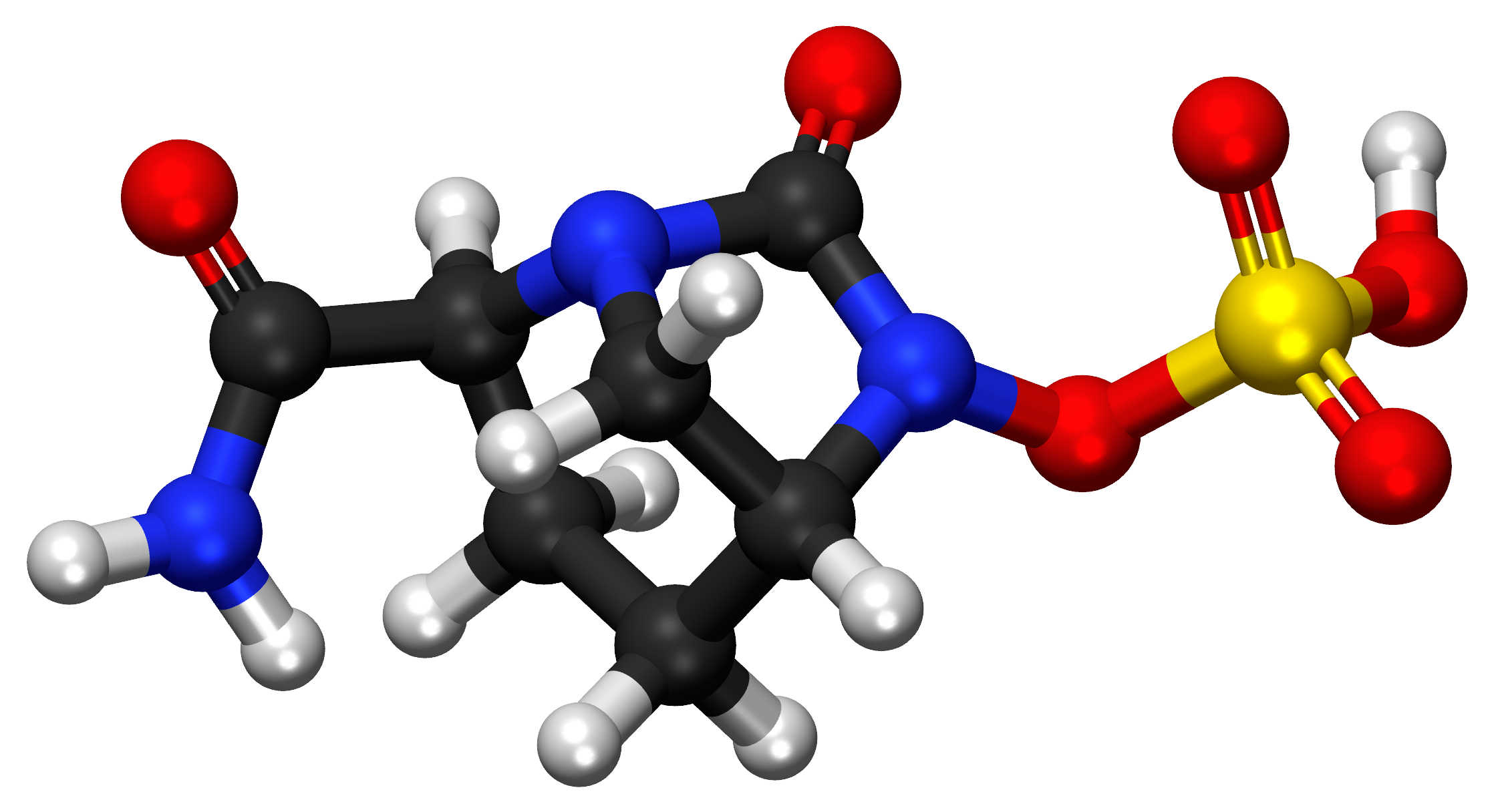

Clinical data
- Trade names: Avycaz (formulated with ceftazidime)
- License data: US DailyMed: Avibactam
- Routes of administration: Intravenous therapy
- ATC code: None

Legal status
- Legal status: US: ℞-only

Pharmacokinetic data
- Bioavailability: 100% (intravenous)
- Protein binding: 5.7–8.2%
- Metabolism: Nil
- Onset of action: Increases in proportion to dose
- Excretion: Kidney (97%)

Identifiers
- IUPAC name: [(2S,5R)-2-Carbamoyl-7-oxo-1,6-diazabicyclo[3.2.1]octan-6-yl] hydrogen sulfate
- CAS Number: 1192500-31-4
- PubChem CID: 9835049
- ChemSpider: 8010770
- UNII: 7352665165
- KEGG: D10340
- ChEBI: CHEBI:85984
- ChEMBL: ChEMBL1689063
- CompTox Dashboard (EPA): DTXSID901026066

Chemical and physical data
- Formula: C_{7}H_{11}N_{3}O_{6}S
- Molar mass: 265.24 g·mol^{−1}
- 3D model (JSmol): Interactive image
- SMILES: NC([C@H]1[N@](C(N2OS(O)(=O)=O)=O)C[C@H]2CC1)=O
- InChI: InChI=1S/C7H11N3O6S/c8-6(11)5-2-1-4-3-9(5)7(12)10(4)16-17(13,14)15/h4-5H,1-3H2,(H2,8,11)(H,13,14,15)/t4-,5+/m1/s1; Key:NDCUAPJVLWFHHB-UHNVWZDZSA-N

Avibactam is a non-β-lactam β-lactamase inhibitor developed by Actavis (now Teva) jointly with AstraZeneca. A new drug application for avibactam in combination with ceftazidime was approved by the FDA in 2015 for treating complicated urinary tract (cUTI) and complicated intra-abdominal infections (cIAI) caused by antibiotic-resistant pathogens, including those caused by multidrug resistant Gram-negative bacterial pathogens.

Increasing resistance to cephalosporins among Gram-negative bacterial pathogens, especially among hospital-acquired infections, results in part from the production of β-lactamase enzymes that deactivate these antibiotics. While the co-administration of a β-lactamase inhibitor can restore antibacterial activity to the cephalosporin, previously approved β-lactamase inhibitors such as tazobactam and clavulanic acid do not inhibit important classes of β-lactamases, including Klebsiella pneumoniae carbapenemases (KPCs), New Delhi metallo-β-lactamase 1 (NDM-1), and AmpC-type β-lactamases. Whilst avibactam inhibits class A (KPCs, CTX-M, TEM, SHV), class C (AmpC), and some class D serine β-lactamases (such as OXA-23, OXA-48), it has been reported to be a poor substrate/weak inhibitor of class B metallo-β-lactamases, such as VIM-2, VIM-4, SPM-1, BcII, NDM-1, Fez-1.

For infections sustained by metallo-β-lactamases producing bacteria, a therapeutic strategy consists in administering avibactam as companion drug administered alongside aztreonam. In fact, although in theory aztreonam is not hydrolyzed by metallo-β-lactamases, many metallo-β-Lactamases-producing strains co-produce enzymes that could hydrolyze aztreonam (e.g. AmpC, ESBL), therefore avibactam is given to protect aztreonam exploiting its robust β-lactamases inhibition. Avibactam is available in a combination with aztreonam (aztreonam/avibactam; Emblaveo) and with meropenem (meropenem/avibactam; Meropran-AV).

== See also ==
- Diazabicyclooctane β-lactamase inhibitor
