= Ventilator-associated pneumonia =

Pneumonia due to use of ventilator

- Other names: Ventilator-acquired pneumonia
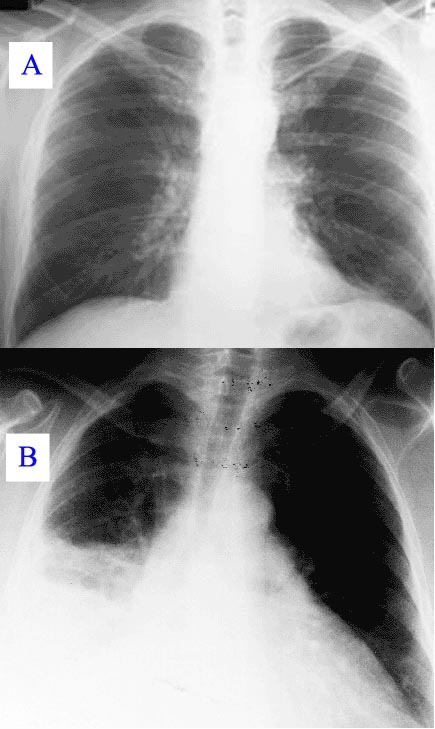
- Chest X-Ray of a person infected by pneumonia
- Specialty: Critical Care Medicine Pulmonology Paediatric Critical Care Medicine Infectious Diseases
- Causes: Mechanical ventilation, Microaspiration past endotracheal tube cuff, prior use of broad-spectrum antimicrobials

Ventilator-associated pneumonia (VAP) is a type of lung infection that occurs in people who are on mechanical ventilation breathing machines in hospitals. As such, VAP typically affects critically ill persons that are in an intensive care unit (ICU) and have been on a mechanical ventilator for at least 48 hours. VAP is a major source of increased illness and death. Persons with VAP have increased lengths of ICU hospitalization and have up to a 20–30% death rate. The diagnosis of VAP varies among hospitals and providers but usually requires a new infiltrate on chest x-ray plus two or more other factors. These factors include temperatures of >38 °C or <36 °C, a white blood cell count of >12 billion/L, purulent secretions from the airways in the lung, and/or reduction in gas exchange.

A different less studied infection found in mechanically ventilated people is ventilator-associated tracheobronchitis (VAT). As with VAP, tracheobronchial infection can colonise the trachea and travel to the bronchi. VAT may be a risk factor for VAP.

== Signs and symptoms ==
People who are on mechanical ventilation are often sedated and are rarely able to communicate due to which many of the typical symptoms of pneumonia will either be absent or unable to be obtained. The most important signs are fever or low body temperature, new purulent sputum, and hypoxemia (decreasing amounts of oxygen in the blood). However, these symptoms may be similar for tracheobronchitis.

== Cause ==
=== Risk factors ===
Risk factors for VAP include underlying heart or lung disease, neurologic disease, and trauma, as well as modifiable risk factors such as whether the head of the bed is flat (increased risk) or raised, whether the patient had an aspiration event before intubation, and prior antibiotic exposure. As a result of intubation many of the body's defenses against infections are reduced or impaired; this can result in an ability for microorganisms to enter and cause infection. Patients who are in the ICU for head trauma or other severe neurologic illness, as well as patients who are in the ICU for blunt or penetrating trauma, are at especially high risk of developing VAP. Further, patients hospitalized for blunt trauma are at a higher risk of developing VAP compared to patients with penetrating trauma.

Ventilator-associated tracheobronchitis may be a risk factor for VAP, though not all cases of VAT progress to VAP.

Recent studies have also linked the overall oral health of a patient to the potential development of VAP; suggesting that bacteria found in plaque can "migrate to the respiratory system."

=== Microbiology ===
The microbiologic flora responsible for VAP is different from that of the more common community-acquired pneumonia (CAP). In particular, viruses and fungi are uncommon causes in people who do not have underlying immune deficiencies. Though any microorganism that causes CAP can cause VAP, there are several bacteria which are particularly important causes of VAP because of their resistance to commonly used antibiotics. These bacteria are referred to as multidrug resistant (MDR).

- Pseudomonas aeruginosa is the most common MDR Gram-negative bacterium causing VAP. Pseudomonas has natural resistance to many antibiotics and has been known to acquire resistance to every antibiotic except for polymyxin B. Resistance is typically acquired through upregulation or mutation of a variety of efflux pumps which pump antibiotics out of the cell. Resistance may also occur through loss of an outer membrane porin channel (OprD)
- Klebsiella pneumoniae has natural resistance to some beta-lactam antibiotics such as ampicillin. Resistance to cephalosporins and aztreonam may arise through induction of a plasmid-based extended spectrum beta-lactamase (ESBL) or plasmid-based ampC-type enzyme
- Serratia marcescens has an ampC gene which can be induced by exposure to antibiotics such as cephalosporins. Thus, culture sensitivities may initially indicate appropriate treatment which fails due to bacterial response.
- Enterobacter as a group also have an inducible ampC gene. Enterobacter may also develop resistance by acquiring plasmids.
- Citrobacter also has an inducible ampC gene.
- Stenotrophomonas maltophilia often colonizes people who have tracheal tubes but can also cause pneumonia. It is often resistant to a wide array of antibiotics but is usually sensitive to co-trimoxazole
- Acinetobacter are becoming more common and may be resistant to carbapenems such as imipenem and meropenem
- Burkholderia cepacia is an important organism in people with cystic fibrosis and is often resistant to multiple antibiotics
- Methicillin-resistant Staphylococcus aureus is an increasing cause of VAP. As many as fifty percent of Staphylococcus aureus isolates in the intensive care setting are resistant to methicillin. Resistance is conferred by the mecA gene.
The development of molecular diagnostic techniques is changing the understanding of the microbiology of VAP, with an increasing appreciation of the role of hard to culture bacteria and the change in the lung microbiome. A recent finding has highlighted the presence of Mycoplasma in the lavage of patients with VAP, a finding which was largely absent from ventilated patients without VAP and healthy controls. The Mycoplasma species most commonly identified, Mycoplasma salivarium, was able to impair the antibacterial functions of monocytes and macrophages.

== Pathophysiology ==
It is thought by many, that VAP primarily occurs because the endotracheal or tracheostomy tube allows free passage of bacteria into the lower segments of the lung in a person who often has underlying lung or immune problems. Bacteria travel in small droplets both through the endotracheal tube and around the cuff. Often, bacteria colonize the endotracheal or tracheostomy tube and are embolized into the lungs with each breath. Bacteria may also be brought down into the lungs with procedures such as deep suctioning or bronchoscopy. Another possibility is that the bacteria already exist in the mucus lining the bronchial tree, and are just kept in check by the body's first line of defenses. Ciliary action of the cells lining the trachea drive the mucus superiorly, leading to a build-up of fluids around the inflated cuff where there is little to no airway clearance. The bacteria can then colonize easily without disturbance and then rise in numbers enough to become infective. The droplets that are driven into the airstream and into the lung fields are lofted by way of Bernoulli's principle. There is also a condition called oxidative damage that occurs when concentrations of pure oxygen come into prolonged contact with cells and this damages the cilia of the cells, thus inhibiting their action as part of the body's first line of defense.

Whether bacteria also travel from the sinuses or the stomach into the lungs is, as of 2005, controversial. However, spread to the lungs from the blood stream or the gut is uncommon.

Once inside the lungs, bacteria then take advantage of any deficiencies in the immune system (such as due to malnutrition or chemotherapy) and multiply. Patients with VAP demonstrate impaired function of key immune cells, including the neutrophil, both in the blood and in the alveolar space, with this impairment being driven by pro-inflammatory molecules such as C5a. These defects in immune function appear to be causally linked to the development of VAP, as they are seen before clinical infection develops. A combination of bacterial damage and consequences of the immune response lead to disruption of gas exchange with resulting symptoms. Although neutrophil-mediated damage is the canonical understanding of VAP pathophysiology, and indeed pneumonia more widely, it is known that patients with neutropaenia can also develop pneumonia. Recent work has identified a sub-set of patients with pneumonia who have low levels of lung neutrophils but extensive lung injury. What drives lung injury in this non-neutrophil setting remains uncertain, but it may relate to abnormal surfactant clearance and loss of tissue factor.

== Diagnosis ==
Diagnosis of ventilator-associated pneumonia is difficult and is not standardized. The criteria used for diagnosis of VAP varies by institution, but tends to be a combination of several of the following radiographic, clinical sign, and laboratory evidence:

1. Temperature greater than 38 °C or less than 36 °C
2. White blood cell count greater than 12,000/mm^{3} or less than 4,000/mm^{3}
3. Purulent secretions, increased secretions, or change in secretions
4. Positive tracheal cultures or bronchoalveolar lavage cultures
5. Some sign of respiratory distress, such as shortness of breath, rapid breathing, abnormal breathing sounds when listening with stethoscope
6. Increased need for oxygen on the ventilator
7. Chest X-rays: at least two serial x-rays showing sustained or worsening shadowing (infiltrates or consolidations)
8. Positive cultures that were obtained directly from the lung environment, such as from the trachea or bronchioles

As an example, some institutions may require one clinical symptoms such as shortness of breath, one clinical sign such as fever, plus evidence on chest xray and in tracheal cultures.

There is no gold standard for getting cultures to identify the bacteria, virus, or fungus that is causing the pneumonia, and there are invasive and non-invasive strategies for obtaining the culture sample. One non-invasive strategy collects cultures from the trachea of people with symptoms of VAP. Another is more invasive and advocates a bronchoscopy plus bronchoalveolar lavage (BAL) for people with symptoms of VAP. Both strategies also require a new or enlarging infiltrate on chest x-ray as well as clinical signs/symptoms such as fever and shortness of breath. There is no strong evidence to suggest that an invasive method to collect cultures is more effective than a non-invasive method. In addition, a quantitative approach to assessing the culture (performing a bacterial count of the pathogen that is causing the pneumonia) does not appear to be superior to a qualitative approach (determining the presence of the pathogen). In recent years there has been a focus on rapid diagnostics, allowing for detection of significant levels of pathogens before this becomes apparent on microbial cultures. Several approaches have been used, including using host biomarkers such as IL-1β and IL-8. Alternatively, molecular detection of bacteria has been undertaken, with reports that amplifying the pan-bacterial 16S gene can provide a measure of bacterial load. A trial of biomarker-based exclusion of VAP (VAP-RAPID2) demonstrated test effectiveness but did not impact on clinical antibiotic prescribing decisions. Studies of pathogen-focussed molecular diagnostics have shown more promise in improving antimicrobial prescribing, with formal findings from the INHALE randomised controlled trial awaited. Highly sensitive molecular diagnostics have the potential to increase antimicrobial use as they detect dead or colonising bacteria, a combination of host-immune profiling and microbial detection may provide the optimal diagnostic technique.

Blood cultures may reveal the microorganisms causing VAP, but are often not helpful as they are positive in only 25% of clinical VAP cases. Even in cases with positive blood cultures, the bacteremia may be from a source other than the lung infection.

== Prevention ==
Prevention of VAP involves limiting exposure to resistant bacteria, discontinuing mechanical ventilation as soon as possible, and a variety of strategies to limit infection while intubated. Resistant bacteria are spread in much the same ways as any communicable disease. Proper hand washing, sterile technique for invasive procedures, and isolation of individuals with known resistant organisms are all mandatory for effective infection control. A variety of aggressive weaning protocols to limit the amount of time a person spends intubated have been proposed. One important aspect is limiting the amount of sedation that a ventilated person receives.

Weak evidence suggests that raising the head of the bed to at least 30 degrees may help prevent VAP, however further research is required to understand the risks associated with this. Antiseptic mouthwashes (in particular associated with toothbrushing) such as chlorhexidine may also reduce the risk of VAP, although the evidence is mainly restricted to those who have undergone cardiac surgery.

American and Canadian guidelines strongly recommend the use of subglottic secretion drainage (SSD). Special tracheal tubes with an incorporated suction lumen as the EVAC tracheal tube form Covidien / Mallinckrodt can be used for that reason. New cuff technology based on polyurethane material in combination with subglottic drainage (SealGuard Evac tracheal tube from Covidien / Mallinckrodt) showed significant delay in early and late onset of VAP.

There is little evidence that the use of silver-coated endotracheal tubes reduces the incidence of VAP in the first ten days of ventilation. There is tentative evidence that the use of probiotics may reduced the likelihood of getting VAP, however it is unclear if probiotics affect ICU or in-hospital death.

== Treatment ==
Treatment of VAP should be matched to known causative bacteria. However, when VAP is first suspected, the bacteria causing infection is typically not known and broad-spectrum antibiotics are given (empiric therapy) until the particular bacterium and its sensitivities are determined. Empiric antibiotics should take into account both the risk factors a particular individual has for resistant bacteria as well as the local prevalence of resistant microorganisms. If a person has previously had episodes of pneumonia, information may be available about prior causative bacteria. The choice of initial therapy is therefore entirely dependent on knowledge of local flora and will vary from hospital to hospital. Treatment of VAP with a single antibiotic has been reported to result in similar outcomes as with a combination of more than one antibiotics, in terms of cure rates, duration of ICU stay, mortality and adverse effects.

Risk factors for infection with an MDR strain include ventilation for more than five days, recent hospitalization (last 90 days), residence in a nursing home, treatment in a hemodialysis clinic, and prior antibiotic use (last 90 days).

Possible empirical therapy combinations include (but are not limited to):

- vancomycin/linezolid and ciprofloxacin,
- cefepime and gentamicin/amikacin/tobramycin
- vancomycin/linezolid and ceftazidime
- Ureidopenicillin plus β-lactamase inhibitor such as piperacillin/tazobactam or ticarcillin/clavulanate
- a carbapenem (e.g., imipenem or meropenem)

Therapy is typically changed once the causative bacteria are known and continued until symptoms resolve (often 7 to 14 days). For patients with VAP not caused by nonfermenting Gram-negative bacilli (like Acinetobacter, Pseudomonas aeruginosa) the available evidence seems to support the use of short-course antimicrobial treatments (< or =10 days).

People who do not have risk factors for MDR organisms may be treated differently depending on local knowledge of prevalent bacteria. Appropriate antibiotics may include ceftriaxone, ciprofloxacin, levofloxacin, or ampicillin/sulbactam.

As of 2005, there is ongoing research into inhaled antibiotics as an adjunct to conventional therapy. Tobramycin and polymyxin B are commonly used in certain centres but there is no strong clinical evidence to support their use.

== Prognosis ==
VAP occurring early after intubation typically involves fewer resistant organisms and is thus associated with a more favorable outcome. Because respiratory failure requiring mechanical ventilation is itself associated with a high mortality, determination of the exact contribution of VAP to mortality has been difficult. As of 2006, estimates range from 33% to 50% death in patients who develop VAP. Mortality is more likely when VAP is associated with certain microorganisms (Pseudomonas, Acinetobacter), blood stream infections, and ineffective initial antibiotics. VAP is especially common in people who have acute respiratory distress syndrome (ARDS).

== Epidemiology ==
Between 8 and 28% of patients receiving mechanical ventilation are affected by VAP. VAP can develop at any time during ventilation, but occurs most often in the first week of mechanical ventilation. There is some evidence for gender differences in the course of VAP: men have been found to get VAP more often, but women are more likely to die after contracting VAP. Recent reports indicate that patients with Coronavirus disease 2019 who require mechanical ventilation in an Intensive care unit are at increased risk of ventilator-associated pneumonia, compared to patients without COVID-19 ventilated in the same unit and patients who had viral pneumonitis arising from viruses other than SARS-CoV-2. Why this increased susceptibility should be present remains uncertain, as the noted reports adjusted for duration of ventilation, it is likely that the increased susceptibility relates impaired innate immunity in the lungs. However several observational studies have identified the use of glucocorticoids as a factor associated with increased risk of VAP and other Hospital-acquired infections.
