= Cefepime =

Fourth-generation Cephalosporin Antibiotic

Clinical data
- Pronunciation: /ˈsɛfɪpiːm/ or /ˈkɛfɪpiːm/
- Trade names: Maxipime, Voco
- AHFS/Drugs.com: Monograph
- MedlinePlus: a698021
- License data: US DailyMed: Cefepime
- Pregnancy category: AU: B1
- Routes of administration: Intravenous, intramuscular
- ATC code: J01DE01 (WHO)

Legal status
- Legal status: AU: S4 (Prescription only); CA: ℞-only; UK: POM (Prescription only); US: ℞-only

Pharmacokinetic data
- Bioavailability: 100% (IM)
- Metabolism: Hepatic 15%
- Elimination half-life: 2 hours
- Excretion: Renal 70–99%

Identifiers
- IUPAC name: (6R,7R,Z)- 7-(2-(2-aminothiazol-4-yl)-2-(methoxyimino)acetamido)- 3-((1-methylpyrrolidinium-1-yl)methyl)-8-oxo-5-thia- 1-aza-bicyclo[4.2.0]oct-2-ene-2-carboxylate
- CAS Number: 88040-23-7
- PubChem CID: 5479537
- DrugBank: DB01413
- ChemSpider: 4586395
- UNII: 807PW4VQE3
- KEGG: D02376
- ChEBI: CHEBI:478164
- ChEMBL: ChEMBL186
- CompTox Dashboard (EPA): DTXSID70873208
- ECHA InfoCard: 100.171.025

Chemical and physical data
- Formula: C_{19}H_{24}N_{6}O_{5}S_{2}
- Molar mass: 480.56 g·mol^{−1}
- 3D model (JSmol): Interactive image
- Melting point: 150 °C (302 °F) (dec.)
- SMILES: O=C2N1/C(=C(\CS[C@@H]1[C@@H]2NC(=O)C(=N\OC)/c3nc(sc3)N)C[N+]4(C)CCCC4)C([O-])=O
- InChI: InChI=1S/C19H24N6O5S2/c1-25(5-3-4-6-25)7-10-8-31-17-13(16(27)24(17)14(10)18(28)29)22-15(26)12(23-30-2)11-9-32-19(20)21-11/h9,13,17H,3-8H2,1-2H3,(H3-,20,21,22,26,28,29)/b23-12-/t13-,17-/m1/s1; Key:HVFLCNVBZFFHBT-ZKDACBOMSA-N

Cefepime is a fourth-generation cephalosporin antibiotic. Cefepime has an extended spectrum of activity against Gram-positive and Gram-negative bacteria, with greater activity against both types of organism than third-generation agents. A 2007 meta-analysis suggested when data of trials were combined, mortality was increased in people treated with cefepime compared with other β-lactam antibiotics. In response, the U.S. Food and Drug Administration (FDA) performed their own meta-analysis which found no mortality difference.

Cefepime was patented in 1982 by Bristol-Myers Squibb and approved for medical use in 1994. It is available as a generic drug and sold under a variety of trade names worldwide.

It was removed from the World Health Organization's List of Essential Medicines in 2019.

== Medical use ==
Cefepime is usually reserved to treat moderate to severe nosocomial pneumonia, infections caused by multiple drug-resistant microorganisms (e.g. Pseudomonas aeruginosa) and empirical treatment of febrile neutropenia.

Cefepime has good activity against important pathogens including Pseudomonas aeruginosa, Staphylococcus aureus, and multiple drug-resistant Streptococcus pneumoniae. A particular strength is its activity against Enterobacteriaceae. Whereas other cephalosporins are degraded by many plasmid- and chromosome-mediated beta-lactamases, cefepime is stable and is a front-line agent when infection with Enterobacteriaceae is known or suspected.

=== Spectrum of bacterial susceptibility ===
Cefepime is a broad-spectrum cephalosporin antibiotic and has been used to treat bacteria responsible for causing pneumonia and infections of the skin and urinary tract. Some of these bacteria include Pseudomonas, Escherichia, and Streptococcus species. The following represents MIC susceptibility data for a few medically significant microorganisms:

- Escherichia coli: ≤0.007 – 128 μg/ml
- Pseudomonas aeruginosa: 0.06 – >256 μg/ml
- Streptococcus pneumoniae: ≤0.007 – >8 μg/ml

=== Cefepime induced neurotoxicity ===
Cefepime crosses the blood brain barrier and exhibits a concentration-dependent γ-aminobutyric acid (GABA) antagonist effect, which can cause neurological symptoms in susceptible individuals, particularly those with renal dysfunction. Up to 15% of ICU patients treated with cefepime will experience cefepime induced neurotoxicity. Symptoms typically begin within 2-6 days of cefepime administration and include diminished level of consciousness, disorientation, aphasia, myoclonus, seizures, and nonconvulsive status epilepticus. Symptoms typically resolve within 1-3 days of discontinuing cefepime.

== Chemistry ==
The combination of the syn-configuration of the methoxy imino moiety and the aminothiazole moiety confers extra stability to β-lactamase enzymes produced by many bacteria. The N-methyl pyrrolidine moiety increases penetration into Gram-negative bacteria. These factors increase the activity of cefepime against otherwise resistant organisms including Pseudomonas aeruginosa and Staphylococcus aureus.

== Trade names ==
Following expiration of the Bristol-Myers Squibb patent in 2020, cefepime became available as a generic and is marketed by numerous companies worldwide under tradenames including Neopime (Neomed), Maxipime, Cepimax, Cepimex, and Axepim.
