= Intra-abdominal infection =

- Specialty: Gastroenterology

Intra-abdominal infection (IAI, also spelled intraabdominal) is a group of infections that occur within the abdominal cavity. They vary from appendicitis to fecal peritonitis. Risk of death despite treatment is often high.

IAI is always caused by an infection, usually a bacterial infection, and it usually results in inflammation of the peritoneum. As a result, IAI is sometimes called peritonitis. However, peritonitis can be caused by non-infectious factors, such as chemical irritation.

== Classifications ==
IAIs can be classified into uncomplicated and complicated infections. Uncomplicated infections often involved the infection of single organ and can be controlled by surgical removal of the source of infection, and antibiotics is not required after the surgery to control the infection. IAI can be diffuse (spread throughout the abdomen) or as localized as an abscess. In complicated infections, the infection can spread to a part or to the whole of the peritoneum, causing peritonitis.

Meanwhile, peritonitis can also be classified into primary, secondary, and tertiary peritonitis.

- Primary peritonitis is the diffuse bacterial infection of the peritoneum while the integrity of the gastrointestinal tract is preserved (in cases of ascites). Primary peritonitis usually involves a single type of bacteria, such as a Streptococcus in young female patients, E. coli in people with chronic liver disease and pre-existing ascites, or a Staphylococcus in people using peritoneal dialysis.
- Secondary peritonitis is the infection of peritoneum where the integrity of gastrointestinal tract is compromised. Among IAIs that require surgical treatment, secondary peritonitis is by far the most common, and there are usually many varieties of bacteria involved.
- Tertiary peritonitis is reinfection of peritoneum 48 hours after apparently good surgical control of secondary peritonitis. This is typically in a person who is already very sick, the reinfection may be an opportunistic infection, and the prognosis is poor.

Local contamination, such as from a hole in a bowel, is not an infection, and therefore not IAI. However, without treatment, it may quickly become an infection.

== Signs and symptoms ==
Those with suspected IAIs usually have acute onset of abdominal pain with signs of local or generalised inflammations such as pain, tenderness (pain on touching), fever, tachycardia (increased heart rate), or tachypnea (increased breathing rate). In more severe cases, such as organ failure, signs such as hypotension (low blood pressure), oliguria (reduced urine output), sudden onset of altered level of consciousness, and lactic acidosis will appear.

In case of appendicitis, signs such as fever, positive psoas sign, migration of pain from umbilicus to the right iliac fossa increases the likelihood of the disease; while signs such as vomiting before the pain reduces its likelihood to occur.

== Diagnosis ==
CT scan and ultrasound has been used routinely to complete the assessment of IAIs. CT scan has higher sensitivity and specificity than ultrasound to access the condition. However, CT scan poses radiation risk to the subject. MRI scan is less readily available than CT scan or ultrasound in hospitals to diagnose IAIs. However, it has been proposed to be used in those who are pregnant and have inconclusive findings on ultrasound. The sensitivity and specificity of MRI in diagnosing acute appendicitis are 94% and 96% respectively.

Laparoscopic surgery has also been used to diagnose the cause of IAIs when imaging is unhelpful. Besides, the laparoscopic surgery can also initiate treatment in the same setting. The accuracy is very high, in the range of 86 to 100%.

== Treatment ==
Treatment usually involves antibiotics. Which antibiotics depend upon the likely source of the infection as well as practical factors such as local availability. If surgery is indicated, then antibiotics can be started before the surgery. Cultures of infected fluids are used in certain circumstances, such as when the person is already taking antibiotics or if the peritonitis is hospital-acquired.

The purpose of most surgeries is to remove the source of the infection, such as stitching shut a hole in a ruptured bowel. Some IAIs, such as acute uncomplicated diverticulitis, may not require surgical intervention. Most that do require surgical intervention are relatively simple, such as an appendectomy. However, some, such as a colectomy for a severe perforated diverticulitis, are more complex.
