= List of antibiotics =

The following is a list of antibiotics. The highest division between antibiotics is bactericidal and bacteriostatic. Bactericidals kill bacteria directly, whereas bacteriostatics prevent them from dividing. However, these classifications are based on laboratory behavior. The development of antibiotics has had a profound effect on the health of people for many years. Also, both people and animals have used antibiotics to treat infections and diseases. In practice, both treat bacterial infections.

== By coverage ==
The following are lists of antibiotics for specific microbial coverage (not an exhaustive list):

=== MRSA ===
Antibiotics that cover methicillin-resistant Staphylococcus aureus (MRSA):

- Vancomycin
- Teicoplanin
- Linezolid
- Daptomycin
- Trimethoprim/sulfamethoxazole
- Doxycycline
- Ceftobiprole (5th generation)
- Ceftaroline (5th generation)
- Clindamycin
- Dalbavancin
- Daptomycin
- Delafloxacin
- Fusidic acid
- Minocycline
- Mupirocin (topical)
- Omadacycline
- Oritavancin
- Tedizolid
- Telavancin
- Tigecycline (also covers gram negatives)

=== Pseudomonas aeruginosa ===
Antibiotics that cover Pseudomonas aeruginosa:

Certain cephalosporins, cephalosporin-beta-lactamase-inhibitor combinations, and new siderophore cephalosporins.

- Ceftazidime (3rd generation)
- Cefepime (4th generation)
- Cefepime/sulbactam
- Ceftobiprole (5th generation)
- Ceftolozane/tazobactam
- Ceftazidime/avibactam
- Cefiderocol(siderophore cephalosporin)

Certain penicillins:

- Piperacillin and Piperacillin/tazobactam
- Ticarcillin/clavulanic acid

Certain carbapenems and carbapenem-beta-lactamase-inhibitors combinations:

- Carbapenems: (meropenem, imipenem/cilastatin, doripenem - NOT ertapenem)
- Meropenem/vaborbactam
- Imipenem/cilastatin/relebactam

Others:

- Fluoroquinolones: particularly levofloxacin, ciprofloxacin
- Polymyxins: Colistin, Polymyxin B
- Aztreonam (monobactam)
- Aminoglycosides - particularly tobramycin and amikacin

=== VRE ===
Antibiotics that usually have activity against vancomycin-resistant Enterococcus (VRE):

- Linezolid and Tedizolid
- Streptogramins such as quinupristin-dalfopristin
- Advanced generation tetracyclines: Tigecycline, Omadacycline, Eravacycline
- Daptomycin
- Oritavancin

Antibiotics with less reliable but occasional (depending on isolate and subspecies) activity:

- occasionally penicillins including penicillin, ampicillin and ampicillin-sulbactam, amoxicillin and amoxicillin-clavulnate, and piperacillin-tazobactam (not all vancomycin-resistant Enterococcus isolates are resistant to penicillin and ampicillin)
- occasionally doxycycline and minocycline
- occasionally fluoroquinolones such as moxifloxacin, levofloxacin, and ciprofloxacin

== By class ==
See also pathogenic bacteria for a list of antibiotics sorted by target bacteria.

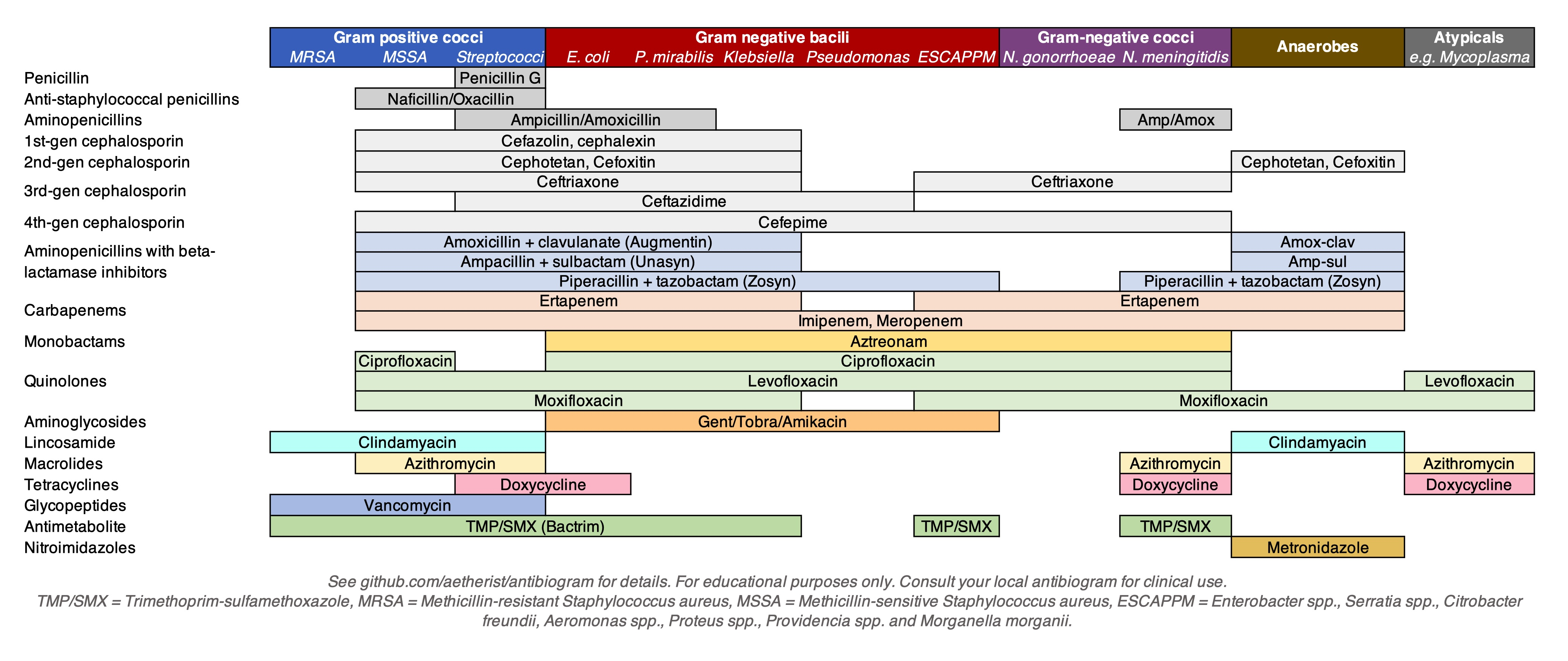

Antibiotics by class
Class	Generic name	Brand names	Common uses	Possible side effects	Mechanism of action
Aminoglycosides	Amikacin	Amikin	Infections caused by Gram-negative bacteria, such as Escherichia coli and Klebsiella particularly Pseudomonas aeruginosa. Effective against aerobic bacteria (not obligate/facultative anaerobes) and tularemia. All aminoglycosides are ineffective when taken orally as the stomach will digest the drug before it goes into the bloodstream. However aminoglycosides are effective in Intravenous, intramuscular and topical forms.	Hearing loss; Vertigo; Kidney damage	Binding to the bacterial 30S ribosomal subunit (some work by binding to the 50S subunit), inhibiting the translocation of the peptidyl-tRNA from the A-site to the P-site and also causing misreading of mRNA, leaving the bacterium unable to synthesize proteins vital to its growth.
Aminoglycosides	Gentamicin	Garamycin	Infections caused by Gram-negative bacteria, such as Escherichia coli and Klebsiella particularly Pseudomonas aeruginosa. Effective against aerobic bacteria (not obligate/facultative anaerobes) and tularemia. All aminoglycosides are ineffective when taken orally as the stomach will digest the drug before it goes into the bloodstream. However aminoglycosides are effective in Intravenous, intramuscular and topical forms.	Hearing loss; Vertigo; Kidney damage	Binding to the bacterial 30S ribosomal subunit (some work by binding to the 50S subunit), inhibiting the translocation of the peptidyl-tRNA from the A-site to the P-site and also causing misreading of mRNA, leaving the bacterium unable to synthesize proteins vital to its growth.
Aminoglycosides	Kanamycin	Kantrex	Infections caused by Gram-negative bacteria, such as Escherichia coli and Klebsiella particularly Pseudomonas aeruginosa. Effective against aerobic bacteria (not obligate/facultative anaerobes) and tularemia. All aminoglycosides are ineffective when taken orally as the stomach will digest the drug before it goes into the bloodstream. However aminoglycosides are effective in Intravenous, intramuscular and topical forms.	Hearing loss; Vertigo; Kidney damage	Binding to the bacterial 30S ribosomal subunit (some work by binding to the 50S subunit), inhibiting the translocation of the peptidyl-tRNA from the A-site to the P-site and also causing misreading of mRNA, leaving the bacterium unable to synthesize proteins vital to its growth.
Aminoglycosides	Neomycin	Neo-Fradin	Infections caused by Gram-negative bacteria, such as Escherichia coli and Klebsiella particularly Pseudomonas aeruginosa. Effective against aerobic bacteria (not obligate/facultative anaerobes) and tularemia. All aminoglycosides are ineffective when taken orally as the stomach will digest the drug before it goes into the bloodstream. However aminoglycosides are effective in Intravenous, intramuscular and topical forms.	Hearing loss; Vertigo; Kidney damage	Binding to the bacterial 30S ribosomal subunit (some work by binding to the 50S subunit), inhibiting the translocation of the peptidyl-tRNA from the A-site to the P-site and also causing misreading of mRNA, leaving the bacterium unable to synthesize proteins vital to its growth.
Aminoglycosides	Netilmicin	Netromycin	Infections caused by Gram-negative bacteria, such as Escherichia coli and Klebsiella particularly Pseudomonas aeruginosa. Effective against aerobic bacteria (not obligate/facultative anaerobes) and tularemia. All aminoglycosides are ineffective when taken orally as the stomach will digest the drug before it goes into the bloodstream. However aminoglycosides are effective in Intravenous, intramuscular and topical forms.	Hearing loss; Vertigo; Kidney damage	Binding to the bacterial 30S ribosomal subunit (some work by binding to the 50S subunit), inhibiting the translocation of the peptidyl-tRNA from the A-site to the P-site and also causing misreading of mRNA, leaving the bacterium unable to synthesize proteins vital to its growth.
Aminoglycosides	Tobramycin	Nebcin	Infections caused by Gram-negative bacteria, such as Escherichia coli and Klebsiella particularly Pseudomonas aeruginosa. Effective against aerobic bacteria (not obligate/facultative anaerobes) and tularemia. All aminoglycosides are ineffective when taken orally as the stomach will digest the drug before it goes into the bloodstream. However aminoglycosides are effective in Intravenous, intramuscular and topical forms.	Hearing loss; Vertigo; Kidney damage	Binding to the bacterial 30S ribosomal subunit (some work by binding to the 50S subunit), inhibiting the translocation of the peptidyl-tRNA from the A-site to the P-site and also causing misreading of mRNA, leaving the bacterium unable to synthesize proteins vital to its growth.
Aminoglycosides	Paromomycin	Humatin	Infections caused by Gram-negative bacteria, such as Escherichia coli and Klebsiella particularly Pseudomonas aeruginosa. Effective against aerobic bacteria (not obligate/facultative anaerobes) and tularemia. All aminoglycosides are ineffective when taken orally as the stomach will digest the drug before it goes into the bloodstream. However aminoglycosides are effective in Intravenous, intramuscular and topical forms.	Hearing loss; Vertigo; Kidney damage	Binding to the bacterial 30S ribosomal subunit (some work by binding to the 50S subunit), inhibiting the translocation of the peptidyl-tRNA from the A-site to the P-site and also causing misreading of mRNA, leaving the bacterium unable to synthesize proteins vital to its growth.
Aminoglycosides	Streptomycin		Tuberculosis	Hearing loss; Vertigo; Kidney damage	Binding to the bacterial 30S ribosomal subunit (some work by binding to the 50S subunit), inhibiting the translocation of the peptidyl-tRNA from the A-site to the P-site and also causing misreading of mRNA, leaving the bacterium unable to synthesize proteins vital to its growth.
Aminoglycosides	Spectinomycin(Bs)	Trobicin	Gonorrhea		
Ansamycins; Benzoquinones	Geldanamycin		Experimental, as antitumor antibiotics		Block DNA transcription, either via inhibiting DNA-dependent RNA polymerase by binding to the β-subunit
Ansamycins; Benzoquinones	Herbimycin		Experimental, as antitumor antibiotics		Block DNA transcription, either via inhibiting DNA-dependent RNA polymerase by binding to the β-subunit
Ansamycins; Benzoquinones	Ansamitocin		Experimental, as antitumor antibiotics		Block DNA transcription, either via inhibiting DNA-dependent RNA polymerase by binding to the β-subunit
Ansamycins; Rifamycins	Rifaximin	Xifaxan	Traveler's diarrhea caused by E. coli		
Ansamycins; Rifamycins	Rifampicin (Rifampin in US)	Rifadin, Rimactane	mostly Gram-positive and mycobacteria	Reddish-orange sweat, tears, and urine	Binds to the β subunit of RNA polymerase to inhibit transcription
Ansamycins; Rifamycins	Rifabutin	Mycobutin	Mycobacterium avium complex	Rash, discolored urine, GI symptoms	
Ansamycins; Rifamycins	Rifapentine	Priftin	Antituberculosis		
Ansamycins; Rifamycins	Rifalazil		Chlamydia infection, Clostridioides difficile associated diarrhea, Trachoma, Tuberculosis,Leprosy, Buruli ulcer		blocking off the β-subunit in RNA polymerase
Carbacephem	Loracarbef	Lorabid	Discontinued		Prevents bacterial cell division by inhibiting cell wall synthesis.
Beta Lactams; Carbapenems	Ertapenem	Invanz	Bactericidal for both Gram-positive and Gram-negative organisms and therefore useful for empiric broad-spectrum antibacterial coverage. (Notes: MRSA resistance to this class. All are active against Pseudomonas aeruginosa except ertapenem.)	Gastrointestinal upset and diarrhea; Nausea; Seizures; Headache; Rash and allergic reactions	Inhibition of cell wall synthesis
Beta Lactams; Carbapenems	Doripenem	Doribax	Bactericidal for both Gram-positive and Gram-negative organisms and therefore useful for empiric broad-spectrum antibacterial coverage. (Notes: MRSA resistance to this class. All are active against Pseudomonas aeruginosa except ertapenem.)	Gastrointestinal upset and diarrhea; Nausea; Seizures; Headache; Rash and allergic reactions	Inhibition of cell wall synthesis
Beta Lactams; Carbapenems	Imipenem/Cilastatin	Primaxin	Bactericidal for both Gram-positive and Gram-negative organisms and therefore useful for empiric broad-spectrum antibacterial coverage. (Notes: MRSA resistance to this class. All are active against Pseudomonas aeruginosa except ertapenem.)	Gastrointestinal upset and diarrhea; Nausea; Seizures; Headache; Rash and allergic reactions	Inhibition of cell wall synthesis
Beta Lactams; Carbapenems	Meropenem	Merrem	Bactericidal for both Gram-positive and Gram-negative organisms and therefore useful for empiric broad-spectrum antibacterial coverage. (Notes: MRSA resistance to this class. All are active against Pseudomonas aeruginosa except ertapenem.)	Gastrointestinal upset and diarrhea; Nausea; Seizures; Headache; Rash and allergic reactions	Inhibition of cell wall synthesis
Beta Lactams; Cephalosporins (First generation)	Cefadroxil	Duricef	Good coverage against Gram-positive infections.	Gastrointestinal upset and diarrhea; Nausea (if alcohol taken concurrently); Allergic reactions	Same mode of action as other beta-lactam antibiotics: disrupt the synthesis of the peptidoglycan layer of bacterial cell walls.
Beta Lactams; Cephalosporins (First generation)	Cefazolin	Ancef, Kefzol	Good coverage against Gram-positive infections.	Gastrointestinal upset and diarrhea; Nausea (if alcohol taken concurrently); Allergic reactions	Same mode of action as other beta-lactam antibiotics: disrupt the synthesis of the peptidoglycan layer of bacterial cell walls.
Beta Lactams; Cephalosporins (First generation)	Cephradine		Good coverage against Gram-positive infections.	Gastrointestinal upset and diarrhea; Nausea (if alcohol taken concurrently); Allergic reactions	Same mode of action as other beta-lactam antibiotics: disrupt the synthesis of the peptidoglycan layer of bacterial cell walls.
Beta Lactams; Cephalosporins (First generation)	Cephapirin		Good coverage against Gram-positive infections.	Gastrointestinal upset and diarrhea; Nausea (if alcohol taken concurrently); Allergic reactions	Same mode of action as other beta-lactam antibiotics: disrupt the synthesis of the peptidoglycan layer of bacterial cell walls.
Beta Lactams; Cephalosporins (First generation)	Cephalothin		Good coverage against Gram-positive infections.	Gastrointestinal upset and diarrhea; Nausea (if alcohol taken concurrently); Allergic reactions	Same mode of action as other beta-lactam antibiotics: disrupt the synthesis of the peptidoglycan layer of bacterial cell walls.
Beta Lactams; Cephalosporins (First generation)	Cefalexin	Keflex	Good coverage against Gram-positive infections.	Gastrointestinal upset and diarrhea; Nausea (if alcohol taken concurrently); Allergic reactions	Same mode of action as other beta-lactam antibiotics: disrupt the synthesis of the peptidoglycan layer of bacterial cell walls.
Beta Lactams; Cephalosporins (Second generation)	Cefaclor	Distaclor, Ceclor, Raniclor	Less Gram-positive cover, improved Gram-negative cover.	Gastrointestinal upset and diarrhea; Nausea (if alcohol taken concurrently) - if contains methylthiotetrazole side group; Hypoprothrombinemia - if contains methylthiotetrazole side group; Allergic reactions	Same mode of action as other beta-lactam antibiotics: disrupt the synthesis of the peptidoglycan layer of bacterial cell walls.
Beta Lactams; Cephalosporins (Second generation)	Cefoxitin		Less Gram-positive cover, improved Gram-negative cover.	Gastrointestinal upset and diarrhea; Nausea (if alcohol taken concurrently) - if contains methylthiotetrazole side group; Hypoprothrombinemia - if contains methylthiotetrazole side group; Allergic reactions	Same mode of action as other beta-lactam antibiotics: disrupt the synthesis of the peptidoglycan layer of bacterial cell walls.
Beta Lactams; Cephalosporins (Second generation)	Cefotetan	Cefotan	Less Gram-positive cover, improved Gram-negative cover.	Gastrointestinal upset and diarrhea; Nausea (if alcohol taken concurrently) - if contains methylthiotetrazole side group; Hypoprothrombinemia - if contains methylthiotetrazole side group; Allergic reactions	Same mode of action as other beta-lactam antibiotics: disrupt the synthesis of the peptidoglycan layer of bacterial cell walls.
Beta Lactams; Cephalosporins (Second generation)	Cefamandole		Less Gram-positive cover, improved Gram-negative cover.	Gastrointestinal upset and diarrhea; Nausea (if alcohol taken concurrently) - if contains methylthiotetrazole side group; Hypoprothrombinemia - if contains methylthiotetrazole side group; Allergic reactions	Same mode of action as other beta-lactam antibiotics: disrupt the synthesis of the peptidoglycan layer of bacterial cell walls.
Beta Lactams; Cephalosporins (Second generation)	Cefmetazole		Less Gram-positive cover, improved Gram-negative cover.	Gastrointestinal upset and diarrhea; Nausea (if alcohol taken concurrently) - if contains methylthiotetrazole side group; Hypoprothrombinemia - if contains methylthiotetrazole side group; Allergic reactions	Same mode of action as other beta-lactam antibiotics: disrupt the synthesis of the peptidoglycan layer of bacterial cell walls.
Beta Lactams; Cephalosporins (Second generation)	Cefonicid		Less Gram-positive cover, improved Gram-negative cover.	Gastrointestinal upset and diarrhea; Nausea (if alcohol taken concurrently) - if contains methylthiotetrazole side group; Hypoprothrombinemia - if contains methylthiotetrazole side group; Allergic reactions	Same mode of action as other beta-lactam antibiotics: disrupt the synthesis of the peptidoglycan layer of bacterial cell walls.
Beta Lactams; Cephalosporins (Second generation)	Loracarbef		Less Gram-positive cover, improved Gram-negative cover.	Gastrointestinal upset and diarrhea; Nausea (if alcohol taken concurrently) - if contains methylthiotetrazole side group; Hypoprothrombinemia - if contains methylthiotetrazole side group; Allergic reactions	Same mode of action as other beta-lactam antibiotics: disrupt the synthesis of the peptidoglycan layer of bacterial cell walls.
Beta Lactams; Cephalosporins (Second generation)	Cefprozil	Cefzil	Less Gram-positive cover, improved Gram-negative cover.	Gastrointestinal upset and diarrhea; Nausea (if alcohol taken concurrently) - if contains methylthiotetrazole side group; Hypoprothrombinemia - if contains methylthiotetrazole side group; Allergic reactions	Same mode of action as other beta-lactam antibiotics: disrupt the synthesis of the peptidoglycan layer of bacterial cell walls.
Beta Lactams; Cephalosporins (Second generation)	Cefuroxime	Ceftin, Zinacef (UK)	Less Gram-positive cover, improved Gram-negative cover.	Gastrointestinal upset and diarrhea; Nausea (if alcohol taken concurrently) - if contains methylthiotetrazole side group; Hypoprothrombinemia - if contains methylthiotetrazole side group; Allergic reactions	Same mode of action as other beta-lactam antibiotics: disrupt the synthesis of the peptidoglycan layer of bacterial cell walls.
Beta Lactams; Cephalosporins (Third generation)	Cefixime (antagonistic with Chloramphenicol)	Cefspan (Fujisawa), Suprax	Improved coverage of Gram-negative organisms, except Pseudomonas. Reduced Gram-positive cover. But still not cover Mycoplasma and Chlamydia	Gastrointestinal upset and diarrhea; Nausea (if alcohol taken concurrently); Allergic reactions	Same mode of action as other beta-lactam antibiotics: disrupt the synthesis of the peptidoglycan layer of bacterial cell walls.
Beta Lactams; Cephalosporins (Third generation)	Cefdinir	Omnicef, Cefdiel	Improved coverage of Gram-negative organisms, except Pseudomonas. Reduced Gram-positive cover. But still not cover Mycoplasma and Chlamydia	Gastrointestinal upset and diarrhea; Nausea (if alcohol taken concurrently); Allergic reactions	Same mode of action as other beta-lactam antibiotics: disrupt the synthesis of the peptidoglycan layer of bacterial cell walls.
Beta Lactams; Cephalosporins (Third generation)	Cefditoren	Spectracef, Meiact	Improved coverage of Gram-negative organisms, except Pseudomonas. Reduced Gram-positive cover. But still not cover Mycoplasma and Chlamydia	Gastrointestinal upset and diarrhea; Nausea (if alcohol taken concurrently); Allergic reactions	Same mode of action as other beta-lactam antibiotics: disrupt the synthesis of the peptidoglycan layer of bacterial cell walls.
Beta Lactams; Cephalosporins (Third generation)	Cefoperazone [Unlike most third-generation agents, cefoperazone is active against Pseudomonas aeruginosa], combination Cefoperazone with Sulbactam makes more effective antibiotic, because Sulbactam avoid degeneration of Cefoperazone	Cefobid (discontinued)	Improved coverage of Gram-negative organisms, except Pseudomonas. Reduced Gram-positive cover. But still not cover Mycoplasma and Chlamydia	Gastrointestinal upset and diarrhea; Nausea (if alcohol taken concurrently); Allergic reactions	Same mode of action as other beta-lactam antibiotics: disrupt the synthesis of the peptidoglycan layer of bacterial cell walls.
Beta Lactams; Cephalosporins (Third generation)	Cefotaxime	Claforan	Improved coverage of Gram-negative organisms, except Pseudomonas. Reduced Gram-positive cover. But still not cover Mycoplasma and Chlamydia	Gastrointestinal upset and diarrhea; Nausea (if alcohol taken concurrently); Allergic reactions	Same mode of action as other beta-lactam antibiotics: disrupt the synthesis of the peptidoglycan layer of bacterial cell walls.
Beta Lactams; Cephalosporins (Third generation)	Cefpodoxime	Vantin, Banadoz	Improved coverage of Gram-negative organisms, except Pseudomonas. Reduced Gram-positive cover. But still not cover Mycoplasma and Chlamydia	Gastrointestinal upset and diarrhea; Nausea (if alcohol taken concurrently); Allergic reactions	Same mode of action as other beta-lactam antibiotics: disrupt the synthesis of the peptidoglycan layer of bacterial cell walls.
Beta Lactams; Cephalosporins (Third generation)	Ceftazidime (Unlike most third-generation agents, ceftazidime is active against Pseudomonas aeruginosa, but less active against Staphylococci and Streptococci compare to other 3rd generation of cephalosporins)	Fortaz, Ceptaz	Improved coverage of Gram-negative organisms, except Pseudomonas. Reduced Gram-positive cover. But still not cover Mycoplasma and Chlamydia	Gastrointestinal upset and diarrhea; Nausea (if alcohol taken concurrently); Allergic reactions	Same mode of action as other beta-lactam antibiotics: disrupt the synthesis of the peptidoglycan layer of bacterial cell walls.
Beta Lactams; Cephalosporins (Third generation)	Ceftibuten	Cedax	Improved coverage of Gram-negative organisms, except Pseudomonas. Reduced Gram-positive cover. But still not cover Mycoplasma and Chlamydia	Gastrointestinal upset and diarrhea; Nausea (if alcohol taken concurrently); Allergic reactions	Same mode of action as other beta-lactam antibiotics: disrupt the synthesis of the peptidoglycan layer of bacterial cell walls.
Beta Lactams; Cephalosporins (Third generation)	Ceftizoxime		Improved coverage of Gram-negative organisms, except Pseudomonas. Reduced Gram-positive cover. But still not cover Mycoplasma and Chlamydia	Gastrointestinal upset and diarrhea; Nausea (if alcohol taken concurrently); Allergic reactions	Same mode of action as other beta-lactam antibiotics: disrupt the synthesis of the peptidoglycan layer of bacterial cell walls.
Beta Lactams; Cephalosporins (Third generation)	Moxalactam		Improved coverage of Gram-negative organisms, except Pseudomonas. Reduced Gram-positive cover. But still not cover Mycoplasma and Chlamydia	Gastrointestinal upset and diarrhea; Nausea (if alcohol taken concurrently); Allergic reactions	Same mode of action as other beta-lactam antibiotics: disrupt the synthesis of the peptidoglycan layer of bacterial cell walls.
Beta Lactams; Cephalosporins (Third generation)	Ceftriaxone (IV and IM, not orally, effective also for syphilis and uncomplicated gonorrhea)	Rocephin	Improved coverage of Gram-negative organisms, except Pseudomonas. Reduced Gram-positive cover. But still not cover Mycoplasma and Chlamydia	Gastrointestinal upset and diarrhea; Nausea (if alcohol taken concurrently); Allergic reactions	Same mode of action as other beta-lactam antibiotics: disrupt the synthesis of the peptidoglycan layer of bacterial cell walls.
Beta Lactams; Cephalosporins (Fourth generation)	Cefepime	Maxipime	Covers pseudomonal infections.	Gastrointestinal upset and diarrhea; Nausea (if alcohol taken concurrently); Allergic reactions	Same mode of action as other beta-lactam antibiotics: disrupt the synthesis of the peptidoglycan layer of bacterial cell walls.
Beta Lactams; Cephalosporins (Fifth generation)	Ceftaroline fosamil	Teflaro	Used to treat MRSA	Gastrointestinal upset and diarrhea; Allergic reaction	Same mode of action as other beta-lactam antibiotics: disrupt the synthesis of the peptidoglycan layer of bacterial cell walls.
Beta Lactams; Cephalosporins (Fifth generation)	Ceftobiprole	Zeftera	Used to treat MRSA (methicillin-resistant Staphylococcus aureus), penicillin-resistant Streptococcus pneumoniae, Pseudomonas aeruginosa, and enterococci	Gastrointestinal upset and diarrhea; Nausea (if alcohol taken concurrently); Allergic reactions	Same mode of action as other beta-lactam antibiotics: disrupt the synthesis of the peptidoglycan layer of bacterial cell walls.
Glycopeptides	Teicoplanin	Targocid (UK)	Active against aerobic and anaerobic Gram-positive bacteria including MRSA; Vancomycin is used orally for the treatment of C. difficile colitis		Inhibits peptidoglycan synthesis.
Glycopeptides	Vancomycin	Vancocin	Active against aerobic and anaerobic Gram-positive bacteria including MRSA; Vancomycin is used orally for the treatment of C. difficile colitis		Inhibits peptidoglycan synthesis.
Glycopeptides	Telavancin	Vibativ	Active against aerobic and anaerobic Gram-positive bacteria including MRSA; Vancomycin is used orally for the treatment of C. difficile colitis		Inhibits peptidoglycan synthesis.
Glycopeptides	Dalbavancin	Dalvance	Active against aerobic and anaerobic Gram-positive bacteria including MRSA; Vancomycin is used orally for the treatment of C. difficile colitis		Inhibits peptidoglycan synthesis.
Glycopeptides	Oritavancin	Orbactiv	Active against aerobic and anaerobic Gram-positive bacteria including MRSA; Vancomycin is used orally for the treatment of C. difficile colitis		Inhibits peptidoglycan synthesis.
Lincosamides (Bs)	Clindamycin	Cleocin	Serious staph-, pneumo-, and streptococcal infections in penicillin-allergic patients, also anaerobic infections; clindamycin topically for acne	Possible C. difficile-related pseudomembranous enterocolitis	Binds to 50S subunit of bacterial ribosomal RNA thereby inhibiting protein synthesis.
Lincosamides (Bs)	Lincomycin	Lincocin	Serious staph-, pneumo-, and streptococcal infections in penicillin-allergic patients, also anaerobic infections; clindamycin topically for acne	Possible C. difficile-related pseudomembranous enterocolitis	Binds to 50S subunit of bacterial ribosomal RNA thereby inhibiting protein synthesis.
Lipopeptide	Daptomycin	Cubicin	Gram-positive organisms, but is inhibited by pulmonary surfactant so less effective against pneumonias		Binds to the membrane and cause rapid depolarization, resulting in a loss of membrane potential leading to inhibition of protein, DNA and RNA synthesis.
Macrolides (Bs)	Azithromycin	Zithromax, Sumamed, Xithrone	Streptococcal infections, syphilis, upper respiratory tract infections, lower respiratory tract infections, mycoplasmal infections, Lyme disease	Nausea, vomiting, and diarrhea (especially at higher doses); Prolonged cardiac QT interval (especially erythromycin); Hearing loss (especially at higher doses); Jaundice	Inhibition of bacterial protein biosynthesis by binding reversibly to the subunit 50S of the bacterial ribosome, thereby inhibiting translocation of peptidyl tRNA.
Macrolides (Bs)	Clarithromycin	Biaxin	Streptococcal infections, syphilis, upper respiratory tract infections, lower respiratory tract infections, mycoplasmal infections, Lyme disease	Nausea, vomiting, and diarrhea (especially at higher doses); Prolonged cardiac QT interval (especially erythromycin); Hearing loss (especially at higher doses); Jaundice	Inhibition of bacterial protein biosynthesis by binding reversibly to the subunit 50S of the bacterial ribosome, thereby inhibiting translocation of peptidyl tRNA.
Macrolides (Bs)	Erythromycin	Erythocin, Erythroped	Streptococcal infections, syphilis, upper respiratory tract infections, lower respiratory tract infections, mycoplasmal infections, Lyme disease	Nausea, vomiting, and diarrhea (especially at higher doses); Prolonged cardiac QT interval (especially erythromycin); Hearing loss (especially at higher doses); Jaundice	Inhibition of bacterial protein biosynthesis by binding reversibly to the subunit 50S of the bacterial ribosome, thereby inhibiting translocation of peptidyl tRNA.
Macrolides (Bs)	Roxithromycin		Streptococcal infections, syphilis, upper respiratory tract infections, lower respiratory tract infections, mycoplasmal infections, Lyme disease	Nausea, vomiting, and diarrhea (especially at higher doses); Prolonged cardiac QT interval (especially erythromycin); Hearing loss (especially at higher doses); Jaundice	Inhibition of bacterial protein biosynthesis by binding reversibly to the subunit 50S of the bacterial ribosome, thereby inhibiting translocation of peptidyl tRNA.
Macrolides (Bs)	Telithromycin	Ketek	Pneumonia	Visual disturbance, liver toxicity.	Inhibition of bacterial protein biosynthesis by binding reversibly to the subunit 50S of the bacterial ribosome, thereby inhibiting translocation of peptidyl tRNA.
Macrolides (Bs)	Spiramycin	Rovamycine	Mouth infections		Inhibition of bacterial protein biosynthesis by binding reversibly to the subunit 50S of the bacterial ribosome, thereby inhibiting translocation of peptidyl tRNA.
Macrolides (Bs)	Fidaxomicin	Dificid	Treatment of Clostridioides (formerly Clostridium) difficile infection. May be more narrow-spectrum than vancomycin, resulting in less bowel microbiota alteration.	Nausea (11%), vomiting, and abdominal pain.	Bactericidal in susceptible organisms such as C. difficile by inhibiting RNA polymerase, thereby inhibiting protein synthesis.
Beta Lactams; Monobactams	Aztreonam	Azactam	Gram-negative bacteria		Same mode of action as other beta-lactam antibiotics: disrupt the synthesis of the peptidoglycan layer of bacterial cell walls.
Nitrofurans	Furazolidone	Furoxone	Bacterial or protozoal diarrhea or enteritis		
Nitrofurans	Nitrofurantoin(Bs)	Macrodantin, Macrobid	Urinary tract infections		
Oxazolidinones (Bs)	Linezolid	Zyvox	VRSA	Thrombocytopenia; Peripheral neuropathy; Serotonin syndrome	Protein synthesis inhibitor; prevents the initiation step
Oxazolidinones (Bs)	Posizolid	Phase II clinical trials			Protein synthesis inhibitor; prevents the initiation step
Oxazolidinones (Bs)	Radezolid	Phase II clinical trials			Protein synthesis inhibitor; prevents the initiation step
Oxazolidinones (Bs)	Tedizolid	Sivextro			Protein synthesis inhibitor; prevents the initiation step
Beta Lactams; Penicillins	Amoxicillin	Novamox, Amoxil	Wide range of infections; penicillin used for streptococcal infections, syphilis, and Lyme disease	Gastrointestinal upset and diarrhea; Allergy with serious anaphylactic reactions; Brain and kidney damage (rare)	Same mode of action as other beta-lactam antibiotics: disrupt the synthesis of the peptidoglycan layer of bacterial cell walls.
Beta Lactams; Penicillins	Ampicillin	Principen (discontinued)	Wide range of infections; penicillin used for streptococcal infections, syphilis, and Lyme disease	Gastrointestinal upset and diarrhea; Allergy with serious anaphylactic reactions; Brain and kidney damage (rare)	Same mode of action as other beta-lactam antibiotics: disrupt the synthesis of the peptidoglycan layer of bacterial cell walls.
Beta Lactams; Penicillins	Azlocillin		Wide range of infections; penicillin used for streptococcal infections, syphilis, and Lyme disease	Gastrointestinal upset and diarrhea; Allergy with serious anaphylactic reactions; Brain and kidney damage (rare)	Same mode of action as other beta-lactam antibiotics: disrupt the synthesis of the peptidoglycan layer of bacterial cell walls.
Beta Lactams; Penicillins	Dicloxacillin	Dynapen (discontinued)	Wide range of infections; penicillin used for streptococcal infections, syphilis, and Lyme disease	Gastrointestinal upset and diarrhea; Allergy with serious anaphylactic reactions; Brain and kidney damage (rare)	Same mode of action as other beta-lactam antibiotics: disrupt the synthesis of the peptidoglycan layer of bacterial cell walls.
Beta Lactams; Penicillins	Flucloxacillin	Floxapen (Sold to European generics Actavis Group)	Wide range of infections; penicillin used for streptococcal infections, syphilis, and Lyme disease	Gastrointestinal upset and diarrhea; Allergy with serious anaphylactic reactions; Brain and kidney damage (rare)	Same mode of action as other beta-lactam antibiotics: disrupt the synthesis of the peptidoglycan layer of bacterial cell walls.
Beta Lactams; Penicillins	Mezlocillin	Mezlin (discontinued)	Wide range of infections; penicillin used for streptococcal infections, syphilis, and Lyme disease	Gastrointestinal upset and diarrhea; Allergy with serious anaphylactic reactions; Brain and kidney damage (rare)	Same mode of action as other beta-lactam antibiotics: disrupt the synthesis of the peptidoglycan layer of bacterial cell walls.
Beta Lactams; Penicillins	Methicillin	Staphcillin (discontinued)	Wide range of infections; penicillin used for streptococcal infections, syphilis, and Lyme disease	Gastrointestinal upset and diarrhea; Allergy with serious anaphylactic reactions; Brain and kidney damage (rare)	Same mode of action as other beta-lactam antibiotics: disrupt the synthesis of the peptidoglycan layer of bacterial cell walls.
Beta Lactams; Penicillins	Nafcillin	Unipen (discontinued)	Wide range of infections; penicillin used for streptococcal infections, syphilis, and Lyme disease	Gastrointestinal upset and diarrhea; Allergy with serious anaphylactic reactions; Brain and kidney damage (rare)	Same mode of action as other beta-lactam antibiotics: disrupt the synthesis of the peptidoglycan layer of bacterial cell walls.
Beta Lactams; Penicillins	Oxacillin	Prostaphlin (discontinued)	Wide range of infections; penicillin used for streptococcal infections, syphilis, and Lyme disease	Gastrointestinal upset and diarrhea; Allergy with serious anaphylactic reactions; Brain and kidney damage (rare)	Same mode of action as other beta-lactam antibiotics: disrupt the synthesis of the peptidoglycan layer of bacterial cell walls.
Beta Lactams; Penicillins	Penicillin G	Pentids (discontinued)	Wide range of infections; penicillin used for streptococcal infections, syphilis, and Lyme disease	Gastrointestinal upset and diarrhea; Allergy with serious anaphylactic reactions; Brain and kidney damage (rare)	Same mode of action as other beta-lactam antibiotics: disrupt the synthesis of the peptidoglycan layer of bacterial cell walls.
Beta Lactams; Penicillins	Penicillin V	Veetids (Pen-Vee-K) (discontinued)	Wide range of infections; penicillin used for streptococcal infections, syphilis, and Lyme disease	Gastrointestinal upset and diarrhea; Allergy with serious anaphylactic reactions; Brain and kidney damage (rare)	Same mode of action as other beta-lactam antibiotics: disrupt the synthesis of the peptidoglycan layer of bacterial cell walls.
Beta Lactams; Penicillins	Piperacillin	Pipracil (discontinued)	Wide range of infections; penicillin used for streptococcal infections, syphilis, and Lyme disease	Gastrointestinal upset and diarrhea; Allergy with serious anaphylactic reactions; Brain and kidney damage (rare)	Same mode of action as other beta-lactam antibiotics: disrupt the synthesis of the peptidoglycan layer of bacterial cell walls.
Beta Lactams; Penicillins	Penicillin G	Pfizerpen	Wide range of infections; penicillin used for streptococcal infections, syphilis, and Lyme disease	Gastrointestinal upset and diarrhea; Allergy with serious anaphylactic reactions; Brain and kidney damage (rare)	Same mode of action as other beta-lactam antibiotics: disrupt the synthesis of the peptidoglycan layer of bacterial cell walls.
Beta Lactams; Penicillins	Temocillin	Negaban (UK) (discontinued)	Wide range of infections; penicillin used for streptococcal infections, syphilis, and Lyme disease	Gastrointestinal upset and diarrhea; Allergy with serious anaphylactic reactions; Brain and kidney damage (rare)	Same mode of action as other beta-lactam antibiotics: disrupt the synthesis of the peptidoglycan layer of bacterial cell walls.
Beta Lactams; Penicillins	Ticarcillin	Ticar (discontinued)			
Beta Lactams; Penicillin combinations	Amoxicillin/clavulanate	Augmentin	Both Amoxicillin/clavulanate and Ampicillin/sulbactam are effective against non-recurrent acute otitis media. Amoxicillin/clavulanate is one of the few oral antibiotics effective against skin and soft tissue infections. Can be given to children less than 40 kilograms in weight; for children heavier, the dosage is same as adults, twice daily.		The second component reduces the effectiveness of some forms of bacterial resistance to the first component
Beta Lactams; Penicillin combinations	Ampicillin/sulbactam	Unasyn			The second component reduces the effectiveness of some forms of bacterial resistance to the first component
Beta Lactams; Penicillin combinations	Piperacillin/tazobactam	Zosyn			The second component reduces the effectiveness of some forms of bacterial resistance to the first component
Beta Lactams; Penicillin combinations	Ticarcillin/clavulanate	Timentin			The second component reduces the effectiveness of some forms of bacterial resistance to the first component
Polypeptides	Bacitracin		Eye, ear or bladder infections; usually applied directly to the eye or inhaled into the lungs; rarely given by injection, although the use of intravenous colistin is experiencing a resurgence due to the emergence of multi drug resistant organisms.	Kidney and nerve damage (when given by injection)	Inhibits isoprenyl pyrophosphate, a molecule that carries the building blocks of the peptidoglycan bacterial cell wall outside of the inner membrane
Polypeptides	Colistin	Coly-Mycin-S	Eye, ear or bladder infections; usually applied directly to the eye or inhaled into the lungs; rarely given by injection, although the use of intravenous colistin is experiencing a resurgence due to the emergence of multi drug resistant organisms.	Kidney and nerve damage (when given by injection)	Interact with the Gram-negative bacterial outer membrane and cytoplasmic membrane, displacing bacterial counterions, which destabilizes the outer membrane. Act like a detergent against the cytoplasmic membrane, which alters its permeability. Polymyxin B and E are bactericidal even in an isosmotic solution.
Polypeptides	Polymyxin B		Eye, ear or bladder infections; usually applied directly to the eye or inhaled into the lungs; rarely given by injection, although the use of intravenous colistin is experiencing a resurgence due to the emergence of multi drug resistant organisms.	Kidney and nerve damage (when given by injection)	Interact with the Gram-negative bacterial outer membrane and cytoplasmic membrane, displacing bacterial counterions, which destabilizes the outer membrane. Act like a detergent against the cytoplasmic membrane, which alters its permeability. Polymyxin B and E are bactericidal even in an isosmotic solution.
Quinolones / Fluoroquinolones	Ciprofloxacin	Cipro, Ciproxin, Ciprobay	Urinary tract infections, bacterial prostatitis, community-acquired pneumonia, bacterial diarrhea, mycoplasmal infections, gonorrhea	Nausea (rare), irreversible damage to central nervous system (uncommon), tendinosis (rare)	Inhibits the bacterial DNA gyrase or the topoisomerase IV enzyme, thereby inhibiting DNA replication and transcription.
Quinolones / Fluoroquinolones	Enoxacin	Penetrex	Urinary tract infections, bacterial prostatitis, community-acquired pneumonia, bacterial diarrhea, mycoplasmal infections, gonorrhea	Nausea (rare), irreversible damage to central nervous system (uncommon), tendinosis (rare)	Inhibits the bacterial DNA gyrase or the topoisomerase IV enzyme, thereby inhibiting DNA replication and transcription.
Quinolones / Fluoroquinolones	Gatifloxacin	Tequin	Urinary tract infections, bacterial prostatitis, community-acquired pneumonia, bacterial diarrhea, mycoplasmal infections, gonorrhea	Nausea (rare), irreversible damage to central nervous system (uncommon), tendinosis (rare)	Inhibits the bacterial DNA gyrase or the topoisomerase IV enzyme, thereby inhibiting DNA replication and transcription.
Quinolones / Fluoroquinolones	Gemifloxacin	Factive	Urinary tract infections, bacterial prostatitis, community-acquired pneumonia, bacterial diarrhea, mycoplasmal infections, gonorrhea	Nausea (rare), irreversible damage to central nervous system (uncommon), tendinosis (rare)	Inhibits the bacterial DNA gyrase or the topoisomerase IV enzyme, thereby inhibiting DNA replication and transcription.
Quinolones / Fluoroquinolones	Levofloxacin	Levaquin	Urinary tract infections, bacterial prostatitis, community-acquired pneumonia, bacterial diarrhea, mycoplasmal infections, gonorrhea	Nausea (rare), irreversible damage to central nervous system (uncommon), tendinosis (rare)	Inhibits the bacterial DNA gyrase or the topoisomerase IV enzyme, thereby inhibiting DNA replication and transcription.
Quinolones / Fluoroquinolones	Lomefloxacin	Maxaquin	Urinary tract infections, bacterial prostatitis, community-acquired pneumonia, bacterial diarrhea, mycoplasmal infections, gonorrhea	Nausea (rare), irreversible damage to central nervous system (uncommon), tendinosis (rare)	Inhibits the bacterial DNA gyrase or the topoisomerase IV enzyme, thereby inhibiting DNA replication and transcription.
Quinolones / Fluoroquinolones	Moxifloxacin	Avelox	Urinary tract infections, bacterial prostatitis, community-acquired pneumonia, bacterial diarrhea, mycoplasmal infections, gonorrhea	Nausea (rare), irreversible damage to central nervous system (uncommon), tendinosis (rare)	Inhibits the bacterial DNA gyrase or the topoisomerase IV enzyme, thereby inhibiting DNA replication and transcription.
Quinolones / Fluoroquinolones	Nadifloxacin		Urinary tract infections, bacterial prostatitis, community-acquired pneumonia, bacterial diarrhea, mycoplasmal infections, gonorrhea	Nausea (rare), irreversible damage to central nervous system (uncommon), tendinosis (rare)	Inhibits the bacterial DNA gyrase or the topoisomerase IV enzyme, thereby inhibiting DNA replication and transcription.
Quinolones / Fluoroquinolones	Nalidixic acid	NegGram	Urinary tract infections, bacterial prostatitis, community-acquired pneumonia, bacterial diarrhea, mycoplasmal infections, gonorrhea	Nausea (rare), irreversible damage to central nervous system (uncommon), tendinosis (rare)	Inhibits the bacterial DNA gyrase or the topoisomerase IV enzyme, thereby inhibiting DNA replication and transcription.
Quinolones / Fluoroquinolones	Norfloxacin	Noroxin		Nausea (rare), irreversible damage to central nervous system (uncommon), tendinosis (rare)	Inhibits the bacterial DNA gyrase or the topoisomerase IV enzyme, thereby inhibiting DNA replication and transcription.
Quinolones / Fluoroquinolones	Ofloxacin	Floxin (discontinued), Ocuflox		Nausea (rare), irreversible damage to central nervous system (uncommon), tendinosis (rare)	Inhibits the bacterial DNA gyrase or the topoisomerase IV enzyme, thereby inhibiting DNA replication and transcription.
Quinolones / Fluoroquinolones	Trovafloxacin	Trovan	Withdrawn	Nausea (rare), irreversible damage to central nervous system (uncommon), tendinosis (rare)	Inhibits the bacterial DNA gyrase or the topoisomerase IV enzyme, thereby inhibiting DNA replication and transcription.
Quinolones / Fluoroquinolones	Grepafloxacin	Raxar	Withdrawn	Nausea (rare), irreversible damage to central nervous system (uncommon), tendinosis (rare)	Inhibits the bacterial DNA gyrase or the topoisomerase IV enzyme, thereby inhibiting DNA replication and transcription.
Quinolones / Fluoroquinolones	Sparfloxacin	Zagam	Withdrawn		
Quinolones / Fluoroquinolones	Temafloxacin	Omniflox	Withdrawn		
Sulfonamides (Bs)	Mafenide	Sulfamylon	Urinary tract infections (except sulfacetamide, used for eye infections, and mafenide and silver sulfadiazine, used topically for burns)	Nausea, vomiting, and diarrhea; Allergy (including skin rashes); Crystals in urine; Kidney failure; Decrease in white blood cell count; Sensitivity to sunlight	Folate synthesis inhibition. They are competitive inhibitors of the enzyme dihydropteroate synthetase, DHPS. DHPS catalyses the conversion of PABA (para-aminobenzoate) to dihydropteroate, a key step in folate synthesis. Folate is necessary for the cell to synthesize nucleic acids (nucleic acids are essential building blocks of DNA and RNA), and in its absence cells cannot divide.
Sulfonamides (Bs)	Sulfacetamide	Sulamyd, Bleph-10	Urinary tract infections (except sulfacetamide, used for eye infections, and mafenide and silver sulfadiazine, used topically for burns)	Nausea, vomiting, and diarrhea; Allergy (including skin rashes); Crystals in urine; Kidney failure; Decrease in white blood cell count; Sensitivity to sunlight	Folate synthesis inhibition. They are competitive inhibitors of the enzyme dihydropteroate synthetase, DHPS. DHPS catalyses the conversion of PABA (para-aminobenzoate) to dihydropteroate, a key step in folate synthesis. Folate is necessary for the cell to synthesize nucleic acids (nucleic acids are essential building blocks of DNA and RNA), and in its absence cells cannot divide.
Sulfonamides (Bs)	Sulfadiazine	Micro-Sulfon	Urinary tract infections (except sulfacetamide, used for eye infections, and mafenide and silver sulfadiazine, used topically for burns)	Nausea, vomiting, and diarrhea; Allergy (including skin rashes); Crystals in urine; Kidney failure; Decrease in white blood cell count; Sensitivity to sunlight	Folate synthesis inhibition. They are competitive inhibitors of the enzyme dihydropteroate synthetase, DHPS. DHPS catalyses the conversion of PABA (para-aminobenzoate) to dihydropteroate, a key step in folate synthesis. Folate is necessary for the cell to synthesize nucleic acids (nucleic acids are essential building blocks of DNA and RNA), and in its absence cells cannot divide.
Sulfonamides (Bs)	Silver sulfadiazine	Silvadene	Urinary tract infections (except sulfacetamide, used for eye infections, and mafenide and silver sulfadiazine, used topically for burns)	Nausea, vomiting, and diarrhea; Allergy (including skin rashes); Crystals in urine; Kidney failure; Decrease in white blood cell count; Sensitivity to sunlight	Folate synthesis inhibition. They are competitive inhibitors of the enzyme dihydropteroate synthetase, DHPS. DHPS catalyses the conversion of PABA (para-aminobenzoate) to dihydropteroate, a key step in folate synthesis. Folate is necessary for the cell to synthesize nucleic acids (nucleic acids are essential building blocks of DNA and RNA), and in its absence cells cannot divide.
Sulfonamides (Bs)	Sulfadimethoxine	Di-Methox, Albon	Urinary tract infections (except sulfacetamide, used for eye infections, and mafenide and silver sulfadiazine, used topically for burns)	Nausea, vomiting, and diarrhea; Allergy (including skin rashes); Crystals in urine; Kidney failure; Decrease in white blood cell count; Sensitivity to sunlight	Folate synthesis inhibition. They are competitive inhibitors of the enzyme dihydropteroate synthetase, DHPS. DHPS catalyses the conversion of PABA (para-aminobenzoate) to dihydropteroate, a key step in folate synthesis. Folate is necessary for the cell to synthesize nucleic acids (nucleic acids are essential building blocks of DNA and RNA), and in its absence cells cannot divide.
Sulfonamides (Bs)	Sulfamethizole	Thiosulfil Forte	Urinary tract infections (except sulfacetamide, used for eye infections, and mafenide and silver sulfadiazine, used topically for burns)	Nausea, vomiting, and diarrhea; Allergy (including skin rashes); Crystals in urine; Kidney failure; Decrease in white blood cell count; Sensitivity to sunlight	Folate synthesis inhibition. They are competitive inhibitors of the enzyme dihydropteroate synthetase, DHPS. DHPS catalyses the conversion of PABA (para-aminobenzoate) to dihydropteroate, a key step in folate synthesis. Folate is necessary for the cell to synthesize nucleic acids (nucleic acids are essential building blocks of DNA and RNA), and in its absence cells cannot divide.
Sulfonamides (Bs)	Sulfamethoxazole	Gantanol	Urinary tract infections (except sulfacetamide, used for eye infections, and mafenide and silver sulfadiazine, used topically for burns)	Nausea, vomiting, and diarrhea; Allergy (including skin rashes); Crystals in urine; Kidney failure; Decrease in white blood cell count; Sensitivity to sunlight	Folate synthesis inhibition. They are competitive inhibitors of the enzyme dihydropteroate synthetase, DHPS. DHPS catalyses the conversion of PABA (para-aminobenzoate) to dihydropteroate, a key step in folate synthesis. Folate is necessary for the cell to synthesize nucleic acids (nucleic acids are essential building blocks of DNA and RNA), and in its absence cells cannot divide.
Sulfonamides (Bs)	Sulfanilimide (archaic)		Urinary tract infections (except sulfacetamide, used for eye infections, and mafenide and silver sulfadiazine, used topically for burns)	Nausea, vomiting, and diarrhea; Allergy (including skin rashes); Crystals in urine; Kidney failure; Decrease in white blood cell count; Sensitivity to sunlight	Folate synthesis inhibition. They are competitive inhibitors of the enzyme dihydropteroate synthetase, DHPS. DHPS catalyses the conversion of PABA (para-aminobenzoate) to dihydropteroate, a key step in folate synthesis. Folate is necessary for the cell to synthesize nucleic acids (nucleic acids are essential building blocks of DNA and RNA), and in its absence cells cannot divide.
Sulfonamides (Bs)	Sulfasalazine	Azulfidine	Urinary tract infections (except sulfacetamide, used for eye infections, and mafenide and silver sulfadiazine, used topically for burns)	Nausea, vomiting, and diarrhea; Allergy (including skin rashes); Crystals in urine; Kidney failure; Decrease in white blood cell count; Sensitivity to sunlight	Folate synthesis inhibition. They are competitive inhibitors of the enzyme dihydropteroate synthetase, DHPS. DHPS catalyses the conversion of PABA (para-aminobenzoate) to dihydropteroate, a key step in folate synthesis. Folate is necessary for the cell to synthesize nucleic acids (nucleic acids are essential building blocks of DNA and RNA), and in its absence cells cannot divide.
Sulfonamides (Bs)	Sulfisoxazole	Gantrisin	Urinary tract infections (except sulfacetamide, used for eye infections, and mafenide and silver sulfadiazine, used topically for burns)	Nausea, vomiting, and diarrhea; Allergy (including skin rashes); Crystals in urine; Kidney failure; Decrease in white blood cell count; Sensitivity to sunlight	Folate synthesis inhibition. They are competitive inhibitors of the enzyme dihydropteroate synthetase, DHPS. DHPS catalyses the conversion of PABA (para-aminobenzoate) to dihydropteroate, a key step in folate synthesis. Folate is necessary for the cell to synthesize nucleic acids (nucleic acids are essential building blocks of DNA and RNA), and in its absence cells cannot divide.
Sulfonamides (Bs)	Trimethoprim-Sulfamethoxazole (Co-trimoxazole) (TMP-SMX)	Bactrim, Septra	Urinary tract infections (except sulfacetamide, used for eye infections, and mafenide and silver sulfadiazine, used topically for burns)	Nausea, vomiting, and diarrhea; Allergy (including skin rashes); Crystals in urine; Kidney failure; Decrease in white blood cell count; Sensitivity to sunlight	Folate synthesis inhibition. They are competitive inhibitors of the enzyme dihydropteroate synthetase, DHPS. DHPS catalyses the conversion of PABA (para-aminobenzoate) to dihydropteroate, a key step in folate synthesis. Folate is necessary for the cell to synthesize nucleic acids (nucleic acids are essential building blocks of DNA and RNA), and in its absence cells cannot divide.
Sulfonamides (Bs)	Sulfonamidochrysoidine (archaic)	Prontosil			
Tetracyclines (Bs)	Demeclocycline	Declomycin	Syphilis, chlamydial infections, Lyme disease, mycoplasmal infections, acne rickettsial infections, malaria (Note: Note: Malaria is caused by a protist and not a bacterium.)	Gastrointestinal upset; Sensitivity to sunlight; Potential toxicity to mother and fetus during pregnancy; Enamel hypoplasia (staining of teeth; potentially permanent); Transient depression of bone growth	Inhibits the binding of aminoacyl-tRNA to the mRNA-ribosome complex. They do so mainly by binding to the 30S ribosomal subunit in the mRNA translation complex. But Tetracycline cannot be taken together with all dairy products, aluminium, iron and zinc minerals.
Tetracyclines (Bs)	Doxycycline	Vibramycin	Syphilis, chlamydial infections, Lyme disease, mycoplasmal infections, acne rickettsial infections, malaria	Gastrointestinal upset; Sensitivity to sunlight; Potential toxicity to mother and fetus during pregnancy; Enamel hypoplasia (staining of teeth; potentially permanent); Transient depression of bone growth	Inhibits the binding of aminoacyl-tRNA to the mRNA-ribosome complex. They do so mainly by binding to the 30S ribosomal subunit in the mRNA translation complex. But Tetracycline cannot be taken together with all dairy products, aluminium, iron and zinc minerals.
Tetracyclines (Bs)	Metacycline		Syphilis, chlamydial infections, Lyme disease, mycoplasmal infections, acne rickettsial infections, malaria	Gastrointestinal upset; Sensitivity to sunlight; Potential toxicity to mother and fetus during pregnancy; Enamel hypoplasia (staining of teeth; potentially permanent); Transient depression of bone growth	Inhibits the binding of aminoacyl-tRNA to the mRNA-ribosome complex. They do so mainly by binding to the 30S ribosomal subunit in the mRNA translation complex. But Tetracycline cannot be taken together with all dairy products, aluminium, iron and zinc minerals.
Tetracyclines (Bs)	Minocycline	Minocin	Syphilis, chlamydial infections, Lyme disease, mycoplasmal infections, acne rickettsial infections, malaria	Gastrointestinal upset; Sensitivity to sunlight; Potential toxicity to mother and fetus during pregnancy; Enamel hypoplasia (staining of teeth; potentially permanent); Transient depression of bone growth	Inhibits the binding of aminoacyl-tRNA to the mRNA-ribosome complex. They do so mainly by binding to the 30S ribosomal subunit in the mRNA translation complex. But Tetracycline cannot be taken together with all dairy products, aluminium, iron and zinc minerals.
Tetracyclines (Bs)	Oxytetracycline	Terramycin	Syphilis, chlamydial infections, Lyme disease, mycoplasmal infections, acne rickettsial infections, malaria	Gastrointestinal upset; Sensitivity to sunlight; Potential toxicity to mother and fetus during pregnancy; Enamel hypoplasia (staining of teeth; potentially permanent); Transient depression of bone growth	Inhibits the binding of aminoacyl-tRNA to the mRNA-ribosome complex. They do so mainly by binding to the 30S ribosomal subunit in the mRNA translation complex. But Tetracycline cannot be taken together with all dairy products, aluminium, iron and zinc minerals.
Tetracyclines (Bs)	Tetracycline	Sumycin, Achromycin V, Steclin			
Tetracyclines (Bs)	Tigecycline(Bs)	Tigacyl	Slowly Intravenous. Indicated for complicated skin/skin structure infections, soft tissue infections and complicated intra-abdominal infections. Effective for gram-positive, gram-negative, anaerobic, and against multi-antibiotic resistant bacteria (such as Staphylococcus aureus [MRSA] and Acinetobacter baumannii), but not effective for Pseudomonas spp. and Proteus spp.	Teeth discoloration and same side effects as tetracycline. Not to be given to children and pregnant or lactating women.	Similar structure with tetracycline, but five times stronger, big volume distribution and long half-time in the body
Pleuromutilin antibiotics	Lefamulin	Xenleta			
Pleuromutilin antibiotics	Retapamulin	Altabax			
Pleuromutilin antibiotics	Valnemulin	Econor			
Pleuromutilin antibiotics	Tiamulin	Dynamutilin			
Drugs against mycobacteria	Clofazimine	Lamprene	Antileprotic		
Drugs against mycobacteria	Dapsone	Avlosulfon	Antileprotic		
Drugs against mycobacteria	Capreomycin	Capastat	Antituberculosis		
Drugs against mycobacteria	Cycloserine	Seromycin	Antituberculosis, urinary tract infections		
Drugs against mycobacteria	Ethambutol(Bs)	Myambutol	Antituberculosis		
Drugs against mycobacteria	Ethionamide	Trecator	Antituberculosis		Inhibits peptide synthesis
Drugs against mycobacteria	Isoniazid	I.N.H.	Antituberculosis		
Drugs against mycobacteria	Pyrazinamide	Aldinamide	Antituberculosis		
Drugs against mycobacteria	Rifampicin (Rifampin in US)	Rifadin, Rimactane	mostly Gram-positive and mycobacteria	Reddish-orange sweat, tears, and urine	Binds to the β subunit of RNA polymerase to inhibit transcription
Drugs against mycobacteria	Rifabutin	Mycobutin	Mycobacterium avium complex	Rash, discolored urine, GI symptoms	
Drugs against mycobacteria	Rifapentine	Priftin	Antituberculosis		
Drugs against mycobacteria	Streptomycin		Antituberculosis	Neurotoxicity, ototoxicity	As other aminoglycosides
Nitroimidazoles	Metronidazole	Flagyl	Infections caused by anaerobic bacteria; also amoebiasis, trichomoniasis, giardiasis	Discolored urine, headache, metallic taste, nausea; alcohol is contraindicated	Produces toxic free radicals that disrupt DNA and proteins. This non-specific mechanism is responsible for its activity against a variety of bacteria, amoebae, and protozoa.
Nitroimidazoles	Tinidazole	Tindamax Fasigyn	Protozoal infections	Upset stomach, bitter taste, and itchiness	
Others	Arsphenamine	Salvarsan	Spirochaetal infections (obsolete)		
Others	Chloramphenicol(Bs)	Chloromycetin	Meningitis, MRSA, topical use, or for low-cost internal treatment. Historic: typhus, cholera. Gram-negative, Gram-positive, anaerobes	Rarely: aplastic anemia.	Inhibits bacterial protein synthesis by binding to the 50S subunit of the ribosome
Others	Fosfomycin	Monurol, Monuril	Acute cystitis in women	This antibiotic is not recommended for children and 75 and up of age	Inactivates enolpyruvyl transferase, thereby blocking cell wall synthesis
Others	Fusidic acid	Fucidin			
Others	Mupirocin	Bactroban	Ointment for impetigo, cream for infected cuts		Inhibits isoleucine t-RNA synthetase (IleRS) causing inhibition of protein synthesis
Others	Platensimycin				
Others	Quinupristin/Dalfopristin	Synercid			
Others	Thiamphenicol		Gram-negative, Gram-positive, anaerobes. Widely used in veterinary medicine.	Rash. Lacks known anemic side-effects.	A chloramphenicol analog. May inhibit bacterial protein synthesis by binding to the 50S subunit of the ribosome
Others	Trimethoprim(Bs)	Proloprim, Trimpex	Urinary tract infections		
	Generic Name	Brand Names	Common Uses	Possible Side Effects	Mechanism of action

Note: (Bs): Bacteriostatic

== Antibiotic candidates ==
These are antibiotic candidates, and known antibiotics that are not yet mass-produced.

Antibiotic candidates
Generic name	Origin	Susceptible phyla	Stage of development	Mechanism of action
Unclassified
Teixobactin	Eleftheria terrae	Gram-positive, including antibiotic resistant S. aureus and M. tuberculosis	No human trials scheduled	Binds fatty acid precursors to cell wall
Lolamicin		Select gram-negative bacteria	No human trials scheduled	
Malacidins	Uncultured Bacterium	Gram-positive, including antibiotic resistant S. aureus	No human trials scheduled	Binds fatty acid precursors to cell wall
Halicin	Anti-diabetic drug	Clostridiodes difficile, Acinetobacter baumannii, and Mycobacterium tuberculosis	No human trials scheduled	Disrupts electrochemical gradient

== See also ==
- Timeline of antibiotics, listed by year of introduction
- Pathogenic bacteria
