= Timeline of antibiotics =

This is the timeline of modern antimicrobial (anti-infective) therapy. The years show when a given drug was released onto the pharmaceutical market. This is not a timeline of the development of the antibiotics themselves.

- 1899 – Pyocyanase
- 1911 – arsphenamine, also Salvarsan
- 1912 – neosalvarsan
- 1935 – prontosil (an oral precursor to sulfanilamide), the first sulfonamide
- 1936 – sulfanilamide
- 1937 – Promin
- 1938 – sulfapyridine (M&B 693)
- 1939 – sulfacetamide
- 1940 – sulfaguanidine
- 1940 – sulfamethizole
- 1942 – benzylpenicillin, the first penicillin
- 1942 – gramicidin S, the first peptide antibiotic
- 1942 – sulfadimidine
- 1943 – sulfamerazine
- 1944 – streptomycin, the first aminoglycoside
- 1945 – Bacitracin
- 1945 – Dapsone
- 1947 – sulfadiazine
- 1947 – Polymyxin B
- 1947 – Polymyxin E
- 1948 – chlortetracycline, the first tetracycline
- 1949 – chloramphenicol, the first amphenicol
- 1949 – neomycin
- 1950 – oxytetracycline
- 1950 – penicillin G procaine
- 1951 – phenoxymethylpenicillin
- 1952 – erythromycin, the first macrolide
- 1953 – nitrofurantoin
- 1954 – benzathine penicillin
- 1955 – spiramycin
- 1955 – tetracycline
- 1955 – thiamphenicol
- 1955 – vancomycin, the first glycopeptide
- 1956 – phenoxymethylpenicillin
- 1958 – colistin, the first polymyxin
- 1958 – demeclocycline
- 1959 – virginiamycin
- 1960 – methicillin
- 1960 – metronidazole, the first nitroimidazole
- 1961 – ampicillin
- 1961 – spectinomycin
- 1961 – sulfamethoxazole
- 1961 – trimethoprim, the first dihydrofolate reductase inhibitor
- 1962 – oxacillin
- 1962 – cloxacillin
- 1962 – fusidic acid
- 1963 – fusafungine
- 1963 – lymecycline
- 1964 – gentamicin
- 1964 – cefalotin, the first cephalosporin
- 1966 – doxycycline
- 1967 – carbenicillin
- 1967 – methenamine
- 1967 – rifampicin
- 1967 – nalidixic acid, the first quinolone
- 1968 – clindamycin, the second lincosamide
- 1970 – cefalexin
- 1971 – cefazolin
- 1971 – pivampicillin
- 1971 – tinidazole
- 1972 – amoxicillin
- 1972 – cefradine
- 1972 – minocycline
- 1972 – pristinamycin
- 1973 – fosfomycin
- 1974 – talampicillin
- 1975 – tobramycin
- 1975 – bacampicillin
- 1975 – ticarcillin
- 1976 – amikacin
- 1977 – azlocillin
- 1977 – cefadroxil
- 1977 – cefamandole
- 1977 – cefoxitin
- 1977 – cefuroxime
- 1977 – mezlocillin
- 1977 – pivmecillinam
- 1979 – cefaclor
- 1980 – cefmetazole
- 1980 – cefotaxime
- 1980 – piperacillin
- 1981 – co-amoxiclav (amoxicillin/clavulanic acid)
- 1981 – cefoperazone
- 1981 – cefotiam
- 1981 – cefsulodin
- 1981 – latamoxef
- 1981 – netilmicin
- 1982 – ceftriaxone
- 1982 – micronomicin
- 1983 – cefmenoxime
- 1983 – ceftazidime
- 1983 – ceftizoxime
- 1983 – norfloxacin
- 1984 – cefonicid
- 1984 – cefotetan
- 1984 – temocillin
- 1985 – cefpiramide
- 1985 – imipenem/cilastatin, the first carbapenem
- 1985 – ofloxacin
- 1986 – mupirocin
- 1986 – aztreonam
- 1986 – cefoperazone/sulbactam
- 1986 – co-ticarclav (ticarcillin/clavulanic acid)
- 1987 – ampicillin/sulbactam
- 1987 – cefixime
- 1987 – roxithromycin
- 1987 – sultamicillin
- 1987 – ciprofloxacin, the first 2nd-gen fluoroquinolone
- 1987 – rifaximin, the first ansamycin
- 1988 – azithromycin
- 1988 – flomoxef
- 1988 – isepamycin
- 1988 – midecamycin
- 1988 – rifapentine
- 1988 – teicoplanin
- 1989 – cefpodoxime
- 1989 – enrofloxacin
- 1989 – lomefloxacin
- 1989 – moxifloxacin
- 1990 – arbekacin
- 1990 – cefodizime
- 1990 – clarithromycin
- 1991 – cefdinir
- 1992 – cefetamet
- 1992 – cefpirome
- 1992 – cefprozil
- 1992 – ceftibuten
- 1992 – fleroxacin
- 1992 – loracarbef
- 1992 – piperacillin/tazobactam
- 1992 – rufloxacin
- 1993 – brodimoprim
- 1993 – dirithromycin
- 1993 – levofloxacin
- 1993 – nadifloxacin
- 1993 – panipenem/betamipron
- 1993 – sparfloxacin
- 1994 – cefepime
- 1996 – meropenem
- 1999 – quinupristin/dalfopristin
- 2000 – linezolid, the first oxazolidinone
- 2001 – telithromycin, the first ketolide
- 2003 – daptomycin
- 2005 – tigecycline, the first glycylcycline
- 2005 – doripenem
- 2009 – telavancin, the first lipoglycopeptide
- 2010 – ceftaroline
- 2011 – fidaxomicin
- 2012 – bedaquiline
- 2013 – telavancin
- 2014 – tedizolid
- 2014 – dalbavancin
- 2014 – ceftolozane/tazobactam
- 2015 – ceftazidime/avibactam
- 2017 – delafloxacin
- 2017 – meropenem/vaborbactam
- 2018 – omadacycline
- 2018 – eravacycline
- 2018 – sarecycline
- 2018 – plazomicin
- 2018 - cefepime/sulbactam
- 2019 – imipenem/cilastatin/relebactam
- 2019 – lefamulin
- 2019 – cefiderocol
- 2023 – sulbactam/durlobactam
- 2024 – cefepime/enmetazobactam
- 2024 – ceftobiprole
- 2024 – pivmecillinam
- 2024 – sulopenem/probenecid
- 2025 – aztreonam/avibactam
- 2025 – gepotidacin, the first triazaacenaphthylene

== See also ==
- Timeline of medicine and medical technology
- List of antibiotics, grouped by class
