= Ammonium hypochlorite =

Names
- IUPAC name azanium;hypochlorite

Identifiers
3D model (JSmol)	Interactive image
PubChem CID	9833922
- InChI: InChI=1S/ClO.H3N/c1-2;/h;1H3/q-1;/p+1 Key: ZIMQWCPOHZZUEW-UHFFFAOYSA-O
- SMILES: [NH4+].[O-]Cl

Properties
Chemical formula	ClH_{4}NO
Molar mass	69.49 g·mol^{−1}
Density	g/cm^{3}
Solubility in water	soluble
- Except where otherwise noted, data are given for materials in their standard state (at 25 °C [77 °F], 100 kPa). Infobox references

Ammonium hypochlorite is a chemical compound with the chemical formula NH_{4}ClO.

== Physical properties ==
The compound is known in aqueous form only. It quickly decomposes.

== Chemical properties ==
The compound decomposes on boiling with ammonia, forming ammonium chloride:

3 NH_{4}ClO + 2 NH_{3} → 3 NH_{4}Cl + N_{2} + 3 H_{2}O

== Uses ==
Ammonium hypochlorite solutions, diluted to 0.5–1.0%, are used as bactericides and disinfectants for doing the laundry or for cleaning domestic and agricultural premises.
