= Levonadifloxacin =

Chemical compound

Clinical data
- Trade names: Emrok
- Other names: (S)-(-)-Nadifloxacin
- Routes of administration: Parenteral
- ATC code: J01MA24 (WHO)

Legal status
- Legal status: Rx in India

Identifiers
- IUPAC name: (12S)-7-Fluoro-8-(4-hydroxypiperidin-1-yl)-12-methyl-4-oxo-1-azatricyclo[7.3.1.0^{5,13}]trideca-2,5,7,9(13)-tetraene-3-carboxylic acid
- CAS Number: 154357-42-3
- PubChem CID: 9850038
- UNII: 8WHH66L098
- ChEBI: CHEBI:37908
- ChEMBL: ChEMBL190561
- CompTox Dashboard (EPA): DTXSID70165599

Chemical and physical data
- Formula: C_{19}H_{21}FN_{2}O_{4}
- Molar mass: 360.385 g·mol^{−1}
- 3D model (JSmol): Interactive image
- SMILES: C[C@H]1CCC2=C3N1C=C(C(=O)C3=CC(=C2N4CCC(CC4)O)F)C(=O)O
- InChI: InChI=InChI=1S/C19H21FN2O4/c1-10-2-3-12-16-13(18(24)14(19(25)26)9-22(10)16)8-15(20)17(12)21-6-4-11(23)5-7-21/h8-11,23H,2-7H2,1H3,(H,25,26)/t10-/m0/s1; Key:JYJTVFIEFKZWCJ-JTQLQIEISA-N

Levonadifloxacin (trade name Emrok) is an antibiotic drug of the fluoroquinolone class. Chemically, it is the (S)-enantiomer of the racemic drug nadifloxacin.

It is approved in India for the treatment of skin and soft tissue infections of Gram-positive bacteria. It is also being studied for potential use against resistant strains of bacteria including Streptococcus pneumoniae, Streptococcus pyogenes, Haemophilus influenzae, and Moraxella catarrhalis.

Levonadifloxacin has poor oral bioavailability. A prodrug of levonadifloxacin with high oral bioavailability, alalevonadifloxacin, has been developed to mitigate this problem.
