= Lymecycline =

Chemical compound

Clinical data
- Trade names: Tetralysal
- AHFS/Drugs.com: International Drug Names
- Routes of administration: By mouth
- ATC code: J01AA04 (WHO)

Legal status
- Legal status: AU: S4 (Prescription only)

Pharmacokinetic data
- Bioavailability: 100% (oral)
- Elimination half-life: 10 hours
- Excretion: Kidney

Identifiers
- IUPAC name: (2S)-6-[[[(Z)-[(4S,4aS,5aS,6S,12aS) -4-(Dimethylamino)-6,10,11,12a-tetrahydroxy-6-methyl-1,3,12-trioxo-4,4a,5,5a-tetrahydrotetracen-2-ylidene]-hydroxymethyl]amino]methylamino]-2-aminohexanoic acid
- CAS Number: 992-21-2
- PubChem CID: 54707177
- DrugBank: DB00256
- ChemSpider: 20121315
- UNII: 7D6EM3S13P
- KEGG: D06884
- CompTox Dashboard (EPA): DTXSID9045344
- ECHA InfoCard: 100.012.357

Chemical and physical data
- Formula: C_{29}H_{38}N_{4}O_{10}
- Molar mass: 602.641 g·mol^{−1}
- 3D model (JSmol): Interactive image
- SMILES: C[C@@]1([C@H]2C[C@H]3[C@@H](C(=C(C(=O)[C@]3(C(=C2C(=O)C4=C1C=CC=C4O)O)O)C(=O)NCNCCCC[C@@H](C(=O)O)N)O)N(C)C)O
- InChI: InChI=1S/C29H38N4O10/c1-28(42)13-7-6-9-17(34)18(13)22(35)19-14(28)11-15-21(33(2)3)23(36)20(25(38)29(15,43)24(19)37)26(39)32-12-31-10-5-4-8-16(30)27(40)41/h6-7,9,14-16,21,31,34,36-37,42-43H,4-5,8,10-12,30H2,1-3H3,(H,32,39)(H,40,41)/t14-,15-,16-,21-,28+,29-/m0/s1; Key:AHEVKYYGXVEWNO-UEPZRUIBSA-N

Lymecycline is a tetracycline broad-spectrum antibiotic. It is approximately 5,000 times more soluble than tetracycline base and is unique amongst tetracyclines in that it is absorbed by an active transport process across the intestinal wall, making use of the same fast and efficient mechanism by which carbohydrates are absorbed.

The greater absorption of lymecycline allows for lower dosages to be used; the standard dose of 408 mg is equivalent to 300 mg tetracycline base and, in its action, to 500 mg tetracycline hydrochloride. Lymecycline, unlike tetracycline hydrochloride, is soluble at all physiological pH values.

== History ==
Lymecycline was introduced by Farmitalia in 1963.

== Indications ==
Lymecycline, like other tetracyclines, is used to treat a range of infections.

=== Acne ===
Its better absorption profile makes it preferable to tetracycline for moderately severe acne and typically prescribed for 8 weeks at a time, but alternatives should be sought if no improvement occurs by 3 months.

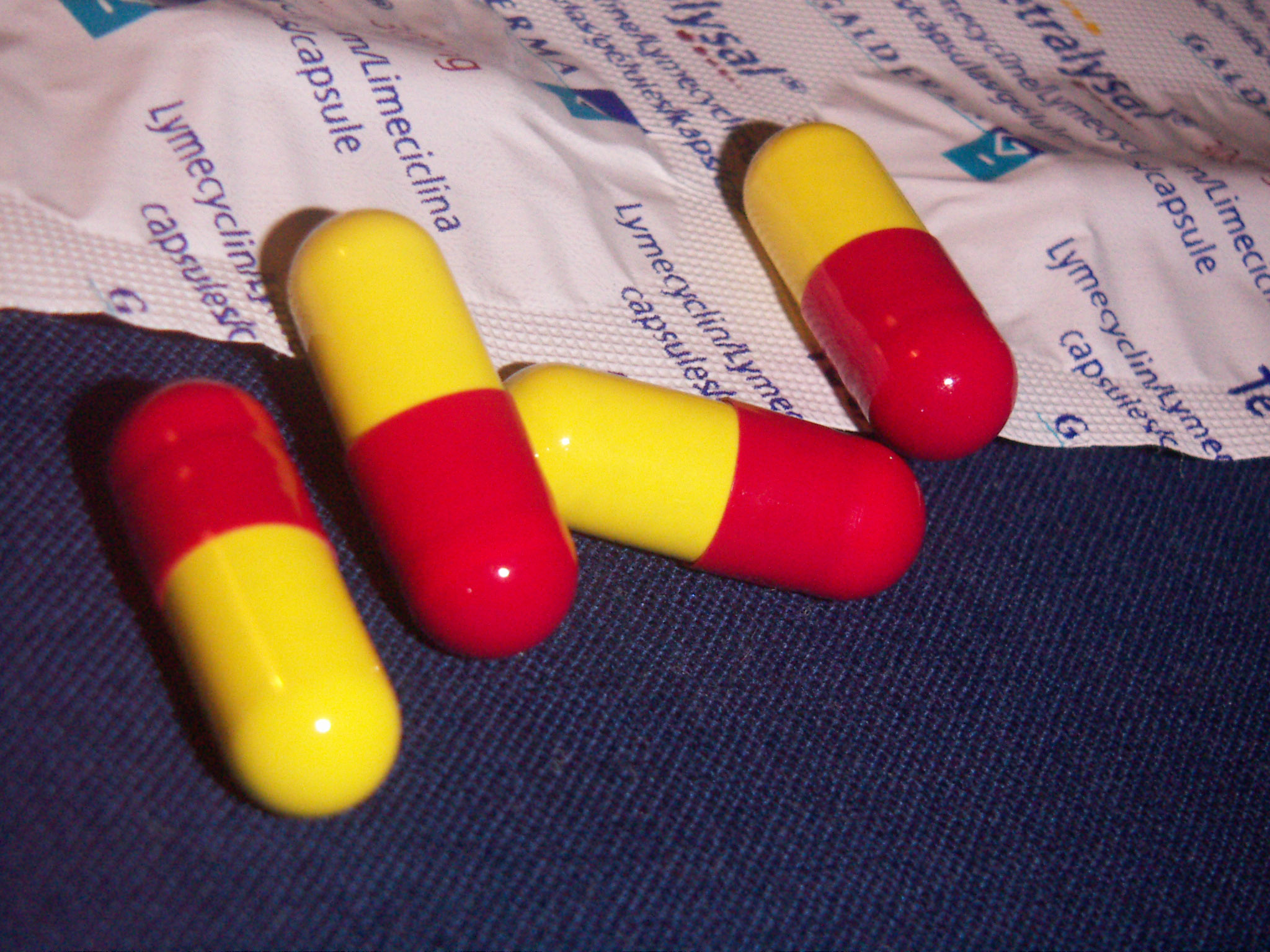
Lymecycline capsules

== Side effects ==
Lymecycline's side effects can include rash, headache, diarrhoea, nausea, vomiting, dermatitis, inflammation of the liver, hypersensitive reactions, and visual disturbances. When taken for a long period of time, it can cause reflux oesophagitis. Recently, the family of tetracycline antibiotics has been associated with thyroid dysfunction in youth.

== See also ==
- Timeline of antibiotics
