= Bacteriostatic agent =

Agent that stops bacteria from reproducing

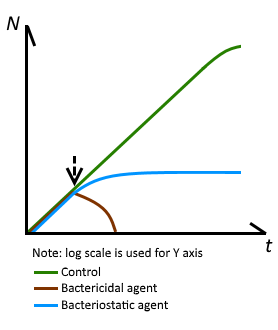
An illustration shows the different effects of the bacteriostatic agent and bactericidal agent

A bacteriostatic agent or bacteriostat, abbreviated Bstatic, is a biological or chemical agent that stops bacteria from reproducing, while not necessarily killing them otherwise. Depending on their application, bacteriostatic antibiotics, disinfectants, antiseptics and preservatives can be distinguished. When bacteriostatic antimicrobials are used, the duration of therapy must be sufficient to allow host defense mechanisms to eradicate the bacteria. Upon removal of the bacteriostat, the bacteria usually start to grow rapidly. This is in contrast to bactericides, which kill bacteria.

Bacteriostats are often used in plastics to prevent growth of bacteria on surfaces. Bacteriostats commonly used in laboratory work include sodium azide (which is acutely toxic) and thiomersal.

== Bacteriostatic antibiotics ==
Bacteriostatic antibiotics limit the growth of bacteria by interfering with bacterial protein production, DNA replication, or other aspects of bacterial cellular metabolism. They must work together with the immune system to remove the microorganisms from the body. However, there is not always a precise distinction between them and bactericidal antibiotics; high concentrations of some bacteriostatic agents are also bactericidal, whereas low concentrations of some bactericidal agents are bacteriostatic. This group includes:

- Chloramphenicol
- Ethambutol
- Lincosamides (including Clindamycin)
- Macrolides
- Nitrofurantoin
- Novobiocin
- Oxazolidinone
- Spectinomycin
- Sulfonamides
- Tetracyclines (including Tigecycline)
- Trimethoprim

== See also ==
- List of antibiotics
- Oligodynamic effect
