= Alalevonadifloxacin =

Chemical compound

Clinical data
- Trade names: Emrok O
- Routes of administration: Oral

Legal status
- Legal status: Rx in India

Identifiers
- IUPAC name: (12S)-8-[4-[(2S)-2-Aminopropanoyl]oxypiperidin-1-yl]-7-fluoro-12-methyl-4-oxo-1-azatricyclo[7.3.1.0^{5,13}]trideca-2,5,7,9(13)-tetraene-3-carboxylic acid
- CAS Number: 706809-20-3
- PubChem CID: 16734914
- IUPHAR/BPS: 10756
- ChemSpider: 19538972
- UNII: 57B7E1D1TG
- ChEMBL: ChEMBL5095635

Chemical and physical data
- Formula: C_{22}H_{26}FN_{3}O_{5}
- Molar mass: 431.464 g·mol^{−1}
- 3D model (JSmol): Interactive image
- SMILES: C[C@H]1CCC2=C3N1C=C(C(=O)C3=CC(=C2N4CCC(CC4)OC(=O)[C@H](C)N)F)C(=O)O
- InChI: InChI=InChI=1S/C22H26FN3O5/c1-11-3-4-14-18-15(20(27)16(21(28)29)10-26(11)18)9-17(23)19(14)25-7-5-13(6-8-25)31-22(30)12(2)24/h9-13H,3-8,24H2,1-2H3,(H,28,29)/t11-,12-/m0/s1; Key:OUXXDXXQNWKOIF-RYUDHWBXSA-N

Alalevonadifloxacin (trade name Emrok O) is an antibiotic of the fluoroquinolone class. It is a prodrug of levonadifloxacin with increased oral bioavailability. In India, it is approved for the treatment of infections with Gram-positive bacteria.
