= Alkaloid (company) =

Macedonian pharmaceutical company

Alkaloid AD Skopje Алкалоид АД Скопје
- Native name: Алкалоид АД Скопје
- Type: Joint Stock Company Pharmaceutical company
- Industry: pharmaceutical, cosmetics, chemical, botanical
- Founded: 15 August 1936; 90 years ago
- Headquarters: Skopje, North Macedonia
- Key people: Zhivko Mukaetov, Zoran Markovski
- Number of employees: 1,580 employees in the country and 420 employees in subsidiaries (2019)
- Website: www.alkaloid.com.mk

Alkaloid AD Skopje (Macedonian: Алкалоид АД Скопје) is a pharmaceutical company in North Macedonia which for eight decades, has been operating in the field of manufacturing drugs, cosmetic and chemical products and processing botanical raw materials.

In the 1990s, the company was privatized, in 1990 it was transformed into a joint-stock company with the participation of the state treasury, and in 1998 into a fully privatized joint-stock company. Alkaloid AD is a joint stock company that consists of two profit centers: Pharmaceuticals and Chemicals, Cosmetics and Botanicals; there are two subsidiaries in the country as well as 16 subsidiaries and 3 representative offices abroad (in Serbia, Montenegro, Kosovo, Albania, Bosnia and Herzegovina, Croatia, Slovenia, Switzerland, Bulgaria, Turkey, Ukraine, the Russian Federation, and the USA).

The company has 1.580 employees in the country and 420 employees in subsidiaries and representative offices abroad.
