= Carbacephem =

Synthetic antibiotic class

Loracarbef, a carbacephem

Carbacephems are a class of synthetic antibiotics, based on the structure of cephalosporin, a cephem. Carbacephems are similar to cephems, but with a carbon substituted for the sulfur.

It prevents bacterial cell division by inhibiting cell wall synthesis.
