= Pernix Therapeutics Holdings =

Pharmaceutical company

- Company type: Public
- Traded as: Nasdaq: PTX
- Industry: Pharmaceutical
- Founded: 1996
- Defunct: 2019
- Headquarters: Morristown, NJ, the United States
- Key people: John Sedor (Chairman, President and CEO), Graham Miao, Chief Financial Officer
- Website: www.pernixtx.com (site taken down)

Pernix Therapeutics was a specialty pharmaceutical business with a focus on acquiring, developing and commercializing prescription drugs primarily for the U.S. market.

== Background ==
Pernix Therapeutics Holdings (Pernix) was a publicly traded specialty pharmaceutical company primarily focused on the sales, marketing, and development of branded pharmaceutical products. The Company marketed a portfolio of branded products, including: TREXIMET, SILENOR, a non-narcotic product indicated for the treatment of insomnia characterized by difficulties with sleep maintenance, KHEDEZLA, as well as CEDAX, an antibiotic for middle ear infections. Founded in 1996, the Company was based in Morristown, New Jersey.

In 2013, Pernix acquired Cypress Pharmaceuticals and Macoven Pharmaceuticals.

In 2014, Pernix became one of the fastest growing specialty pharmaceutical companies in the US, with an expanding CNS franchise and opportunities to branch out into adjacent therapeutic areas. Additionally, in 2014, the company completed several acquisitions including the acquisition of TREXIMET from GSK and KHEDEZLA from Osmotica. In 2013, the company completed several acquisitions of pharmaceutical companies including Cypress Pharmaceuticals, Inc., Hawthorn Pharmaceuticals, Inc., Somaxon Pharmaceuticals Inc.

On February 18, 2019, Pernix Therapeutics Holdings filed a voluntary bankruptcy petition under chapter 11 of title 11 of the United States Code, meaning that the payments on its debt obligations should be immediately paid due to the event of default. Pernix and its subsidiaries simultaneously have filed a variety of “first day” motions in order to continue their operations in ordinary course of business without interruption pending the sale of their assets in one or more going concern sales pursuant to a competitive bidding and auction process. According to Cbonds, the overall amount of outstanding notes were equal to $254 million. Former CEO of Pernix Therapeutics, John Sedor, filed a claim in bankruptcy court for the amount of $1,534,375. John Sedor willingly and knowingly misled employees and shareholders of the company while backdoor negotiating an exit plan for Highbridge Capital Management to inflate the stock price a week before the bankruptcy was declared. This allowed all the insiders who knew of the impending Chapter 11 bankruptcy to sell their shares at a premium.
