= Cefpodoxime =

Antibiotic

Clinical data
- Trade names: Vantin, others
- Other names: Cefpodoxime proxetil
- AHFS/Drugs.com: Monograph
- MedlinePlus: a698024
- Pregnancy category: AU: B1
- Routes of administration: By mouth
- ATC code: J01DD13 (WHO)

Legal status
- Legal status: CA: ℞-only; US: ℞-only

Pharmacokinetic data
- Bioavailability: 50%
- Protein binding: 21% to 29%
- Metabolism: Negligible. Cefpodoxime proxetil is metabolized to cefpodoxime by the liver
- Elimination half-life: 2 hours
- Excretion: Kidney, unchanged

Identifiers
- IUPAC name: (6R,7R)-7-{[(2Z)-2-(2-amino-1,3-thiazol-4-yl)-2-methoxyimino-acetyl]amino}-3-(methoxymethyl)-8-oxo-5-thia-1-azabicyclo[4.2.0]oct-2-ene-2-carboxylic acid
- CAS Number: 80210-62-4
- PubChem CID: 6335986
- DrugBank: DB01416
- ChemSpider: 4891496
- UNII: 7R4F94TVGY
- KEGG: D07650
- ChEBI: CHEBI:3504
- ChEMBL: ChEMBL1672
- CompTox Dashboard (EPA): DTXSID6022765
- ECHA InfoCard: 100.210.871

Chemical and physical data
- Formula: C_{15}H_{17}N_{5}O_{6}S_{2}
- Molar mass: 427.45 g·mol^{−1}
- 3D model (JSmol): Interactive image
- SMILES: O=C2N1/C(=C(\CS[C@@H]1[C@@H]2NC(=O)C(=N\OC)/c3nc(sc3)N)COC)C(=O)O
- InChI: InChI=1S/C15H17N5O6S2/c1-25-3-6-4-27-13-9(12(22)20(13)10(6)14(23)24)18-11(21)8(19-26-2)7-5-28-15(16)17-7/h5,9,13H,3-4H2,1-2H3,(H2,16,17)(H,18,21)(H,23,24)/b19-8-/t9-,13-/m1/s1; Key:WYUSVOMTXWRGEK-HBWVYFAYSA-N

Cefpodoxime is an oral, third-generation cephalosporin antibiotic available in various generic preparations. It is active against both Gram-positive and Gram-negative organisms with notable exceptions including Pseudomonas aeruginosa, Enterococcus, and Bacteroides fragilis. It is typically used to treat acute otitis media, pharyngitis, sinusitis, and gonorrhea. It also finds use as oral continuation therapy when intravenous cephalosporins (such as ceftriaxone) are no longer necessary for continued treatment.

Cefpodoxime inhibits peptidoglycan synthesis in bacterial cell walls. It has an oral bioavailability of approximately 50%, which is increased when taken with food. It has an elimination half-life of 2-3 hours in adults, which is prolonged in renal failure. Approved indications include community acquired pneumonia, uncomplicated skin and skin structure infections, and uncomplicated urinary tract infections.

It was patented in 1980 and approved for medical use in 1989.

== Spectrum of bacterial susceptibility and resistance ==
Cefpodoxime has been used to treat gonorrhoea, tonsillitis, pneumonia, and bronchitis. The following minimum inhibitory concentrations have been reported:

- Haemophilus influenzae: ≤0.03 – 1 μg/ml
- Neisseria gonorrhoeae: 0.004 – 0.06 μg/ml
- Streptococcus pyogenes: ≤0.004 – 2 μg/ml

== Brand names ==
Zoetis markets cefpodoxime proxetil under the trade name Simplicef for veterinary use, and Finecure in India markets the drug as Cefpo.

- Vantin (by Pfizer) in suspension or tablet form.
- Toraxim (by Delta Pharma Ltd., Bangladesh)
- Trucef (by Renata Limited, Bangladesh)
- Tricef (by Alkaloid Skopje, North Macedonia)
- Orelox (by Sanofi-Aventis)
- MAPDOX-CV: Combination cefpodoxime–clavulanic acid
- MONOTAX O (cefpodoxime)/MONOTAX CV (cefpodoxime–clavulanic acid) by Zydus Healthcare Ltd.
- ACXIME 200/CV (by Allencia Biosciences, India)
- POSTPOD-50 (cefpodoxime 50mg/5ml) by Laafon Galaxy Pharmaceuticals
