= Ceftibuten =

Chemical to treat chronic bronchitis

Clinical data
- Trade names: Cedax
- AHFS/Drugs.com: Monograph
- MedlinePlus: a698023
- ATC code: J01DD14 (WHO)

Identifiers
- IUPAC name: (6R,7R)-7-([(Z)-2-(2-Amino-1,3-thiazol-4-yl)-5-hydroxy-5-oxopent-2-enoyl]amino)-8-oxo-5-thia-1-azabicyclo[4.2.0]oct-2-ene-2-carboxylic acid
- CAS Number: 97519-39-6
- PubChem CID: 5282242
- DrugBank: DB01415
- ChemSpider: 4445419
- UNII: IW71N46B4Y
- KEGG: D00922
- ChEBI: CHEBI:3510
- ChEMBL: ChEMBL1605
- CompTox Dashboard (EPA): DTXSID4045925
- ECHA InfoCard: 100.238.211

Chemical and physical data
- Formula: C_{15}H_{14}N_{4}O_{6}S_{2}
- Molar mass: 410.42 g·mol^{−1}
- 3D model (JSmol): Interactive image
- SMILES: O=C2N1/C(=C\CS[C@@H]1[C@@H]2NC(=O)C(=C/CC(=O)O)\c3nc(sc3)N)C(=O)O
- InChI: InChI=1S/C15H14N4O6S2/c16-15-17-7(5-27-15)6(1-2-9(20)21)11(22)18-10-12(23)19-8(14(24)25)3-4-26-13(10)19/h1,3,5,10,13H,2,4H2,(H2,16,17)(H,18,22)(H,20,21)(H,24,25)/b6-1-/t10-,13-/m1/s1; Key:UNJFKXSSGBWRBZ-BJCIPQKHSA-N

Ceftibuten is a third-generation cephalosporin antibiotic. It is an orally administered agent, with two dosage forms, capsule or oral suspension. It is marketed by Pernix Therapeutics under the trade name Cedax.

== Medical uses ==
Ceftibuten is used to treat acute bacterial exacerbations of chronic bronchitis (ABECB), acute bacterial otitis media, pharyngitis, and tonsillitis. It is also indicated for pneumonia, infections of the urinary tract, enteritis, and gastroenteritis.

== Adverse effects ==
In 3,000 patients, ceftibuten was well tolerated. The most frequent reactions were gastrointestinal and nausea.

== Susceptibility ==
Ceftibuten is active against Haemophilus influenzae, Moraxella catarrhalis, Escherichia coli, Klebsiella pneumoniae, K. oxytoca, Proteus vulgaris, P. mirabilis, P. providence, Salmonella sp., Shigella sp., Enterobacter sp., and Streptococcus sp.

The following represents minimum inhibitory concentration (MIC) susceptibility data for a few clinically significant microorganisms:

- Haemophilus influenzae: 0.015–1.0 μg/ml
- Moraxella catarrhalis: 0.5–4.0 μg/ml
- Streptococcus pneumoniae: 0.5–256 μg/ml
