= Roxithromycin =

Chemical compound

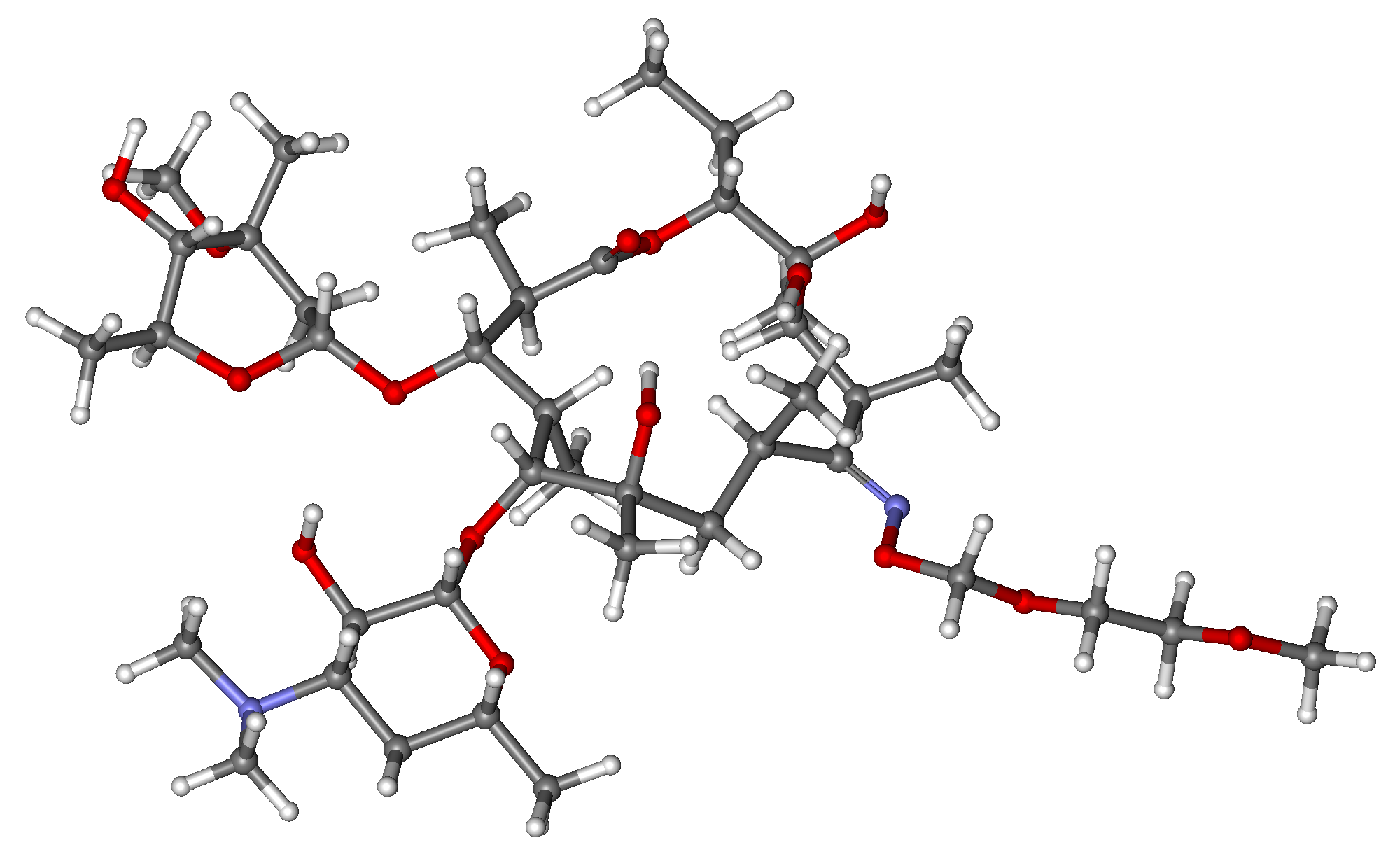

Clinical data
- Trade names: Rulide, Biaxsig, others
- AHFS/Drugs.com: International Drug Names
- Pregnancy category: AU: B1
- ATC code: J01FA06 (WHO)

Legal status
- Legal status: AU: S4 (Prescription only); In general: ℞ (Prescription only)

Pharmacokinetic data
- Metabolism: Liver, peak concentration averaging 2 hours after ingestion.
- Elimination half-life: 11 hours

Identifiers
- IUPAC name: (3R,4S,5S,6R,7R,9R,11S,12R,13S,14R)-6-{[(2S,3R,4S,6R)-4-(Dimethylamino)-3-hydroxy-6-methyloxan-2-yl]oxy}-14-ethyl-7,12,13-trihydroxy-4-{[(2R,4R,5S,6S)-5-hydroxy-4-methoxy-4,6-dimethyloxan-2-yl]oxy}-3,5,7,9,11,13-hexamethyl-10-(2,4,7-trioxa-1-azaoctan-1-ylidene)-1-oxacyclotetradecan-2-one
- CAS Number: 80214-83-1
- PubChem CID: 6915744
- IUPHAR/BPS: 1465
- DrugBank: DB00778
- ChemSpider: 5291557
- UNII: 21KOF230FA
- KEGG: D01710
- ChEBI: CHEBI:48935
- ChEMBL: ChEMBL1214185
- PDB ligand: ROX (PDBe, RCSB PDB)
- CompTox Dashboard (EPA): DTXSID8041117
- ECHA InfoCard: 100.121.308

Chemical and physical data
- Formula: C_{41}H_{76}N_{2}O_{15}
- Molar mass: 837.058 g·mol^{−1}
- 3D model (JSmol): Interactive image
- SMILES: O=C3O[C@H](CC)[C@](O)(C)[C@H](O)[C@H](\C(=N\OCOCCOC)[C@H](C)C[C@](O)(C)[C@H](O[C@@H]1O[C@H](C)C[C@H](N(C)C)[C@H]1O)[C@H]([C@H](O[C@@H]2O[C@H]([C@H](O)[C@](OC)(C2)C)C)[C@H]3C)C)C
- InChI: InChI=1S/C41H76N2O15/c1-15-29-41(10,49)34(45)24(4)31(42-53-21-52-17-16-50-13)22(2)19-39(8,48)36(58-38-32(44)28(43(11)12)18-23(3)54-38)25(5)33(26(6)37(47)56-29)57-30-20-40(9,51-14)35(46)27(7)55-30/h22-30,32-36,38,44-46,48-49H,15-21H2,1-14H3/b42-31+/t22-,23-,24+,25+,26-,27+,28+,29-,30+,32-,33+,34-,35+,36-,38+,39-,40-,41-/m1/s1; Key:RXZBMPWDPOLZGW-XMRMVWPWSA-N

Roxithromycin is a semi-synthetic macrolide antibiotic used to treat respiratory tract, urinary and soft tissue infections. It is a derivative of erythromycin - comprising the same 14-membered lactone ring - with an oxime-based side chain attached to the macrolide ring.

Roxithromycin was patented in 1980 and approved for medical use in 1987. It is available under several brand names in Australia, France, Germany, Israel, South Korea and New Zealand, but not in the United States. Roxithromycin has also been shown to possess antimalarial activity.

== Side effects ==
The most common side effects are gastrointestinal: diarrhea, nausea, abdominal pain and vomiting. Less common side effects include central or peripheral nervous system events such as headaches, dizziness, and vertigo. Rarely seen side effects are rashes, abnormal liver function values and alteration in the senses of smell and taste.

== Drug interactions ==
Roxithromycin has fewer interactions than erythromycin as it has a lower affinity for cytochrome P450.

Roxithromycin is not known to interact with hormonal contraceptives, prednisolone, carbamazepine, ranitidine or antacids.

When roxithromycin is administered with theophylline, some studies have shown an increase in the plasma concentration of theophylline. A change in dosage is usually not required but patients with high levels of theophylline at the start of the treatment should have their plasma levels monitored.

Roxithromycin appears to interact with warfarin. This is shown by an increase in prothrombin time and/or international normalised ratio (INR) in patients taking roxithromycin and warfarin concurrently. As a consequence, severe bleeding episodes have occurred.

== Available forms ==
Roxithromycin is commonly available as tablets or oral suspension.

== Mechanism of action ==
Roxithromycin prevents bacteria from growing, by interfering with their protein synthesis. Roxithromycin binds to the subunit 50S of the bacterial ribosome, and thus inhibits the synthesis of peptides. Roxithromycin has similar antimicrobial spectrum as erythromycin, but is more effective against certain gram-negative bacteria, particularly Legionella pneumophila.

== Pharmacokinetics ==
When taken before a meal, roxithromycin is very rapidly absorbed, and diffuses into most tissues and phagocytes. Due to the high concentration in phagocytes, roxithromycin is actively transported to the site of infection. During active phagocytosis, large concentrations of roxithromycin are released.

== Metabolism ==
Only a small portion of roxithromycin is metabolised. Most of roxithromycin is secreted unchanged into the bile and some in expired air. Under 10% is excreted into the urine. Roxithromycin's half-life is 12 hours.

== History ==
French pharmaceutical company Roussel Uclaf first marketed roxithromycin in 1987.
