= Lefamulin =

Chemical compound

Clinical data
- Trade names: Xenleta
- Other names: BC-3781
- AHFS/Drugs.com: Monograph
- License data: US DailyMed: Lefamulin
- Routes of administration: Intravenous, by mouth
- ATC code: J01XX12 (WHO)

Legal status
- Legal status: CA: ℞-only; US: ℞-only; EU: Rx-only

Identifiers
- IUPAC name: (1S,2R,3S,4S,6R,7R,8R,14R)-3-Hydroxy-2,4,7,14-tetramethyl-9-oxo-4-vinyltricyclo[5.4.3.0^{1,8}]tetradec-6-yl {[(1R,2R,4R)-4-amino-2-hydroxycyclohexyl]sulfanyl}acetate
- CAS Number: 1061337-51-6
- PubChem CID: 25185057
- DrugBank: DB12825
- ChemSpider: 32701544
- UNII: 21904A5386
- KEGG: D11631
- ChEMBL: ChEMBL3291398
- CompTox Dashboard (EPA): DTXSID101027896

Chemical and physical data
- Formula: C_{28}H_{45}NO_{5}S
- Molar mass: 507.73 g·mol^{−1}
- 3D model (JSmol): Interactive image
- SMILES: C[C@@H]1CC[C@@]23CCC(=O)[C@H]2[C@@]1([C@@H](C[C@@]([C@H]([C@@H]3C)O)(C)C=C)OC(=O)CS[C@@H]4CC[C@H](C[C@H]4O)N)C
- InChI: InChI=1S/C28H45NO5S/c1-6-26(4)14-22(34-23(32)15-35-21-8-7-18(29)13-20(21)31)27(5)16(2)9-11-28(17(3)25(26)33)12-10-19(30)24(27)28/h6,16-18,20-22,24-25,31,33H,1,7-15,29H2,2-5H3/t16-,17+,18-,20-,21-,22-,24+,25+,26-,27+,28+/m1/s1; Key:KPVIXBKIJXZQJX-FCEONZPQSA-N

Lefamulin, sold under the brand name Xenleta, is an antibiotic medication used to treat adults with community-acquired bacterial pneumonia. It is taken by mouth or by injection into a vein.

Relatively common side effects include diarrhea, nausea, pain at the site of injection, and liver inflammation. It is a pleuromutilin antibiotic that inhibits the large subunit of bacterial ribosomes.

Lefamulin was approved for medical use in the United States in August 2019, and in the European Union in July 2020.

== Medical uses ==
Lefamulin is used to treat adults with community-acquired bacterial pneumonia. It was also investigated for treatment of acute bacterial skin and skin-structure infections (ABSSSI).

=== Spectrum of activity ===
Lefamulin has in vitro activity against Streptococcus pneumoniae, viridans group Streptococci, Moraxella catarrhalis, Enterococcus faecium, methicillin-resistant Staphylococcus aureus (MRSA), among other bacteria.

== History ==
It was developed by Nabriva Therapeutics and approved in the United States in 2019. It was granted fast track status by the US Food and Drug Administration (FDA) in 2014. Although pleuromutilin antibiotics were first developed in the 1950s, lefamulin is the first to be used for systemic treatment of bacterial infections in humans.

== Society and culture ==
=== Legal status ===
Lefamulin was approved for medical use in the United States in August 2019, and in the European Union in July 2020.
