= Sparfloxacin =

Chemical to treat bacterial infections

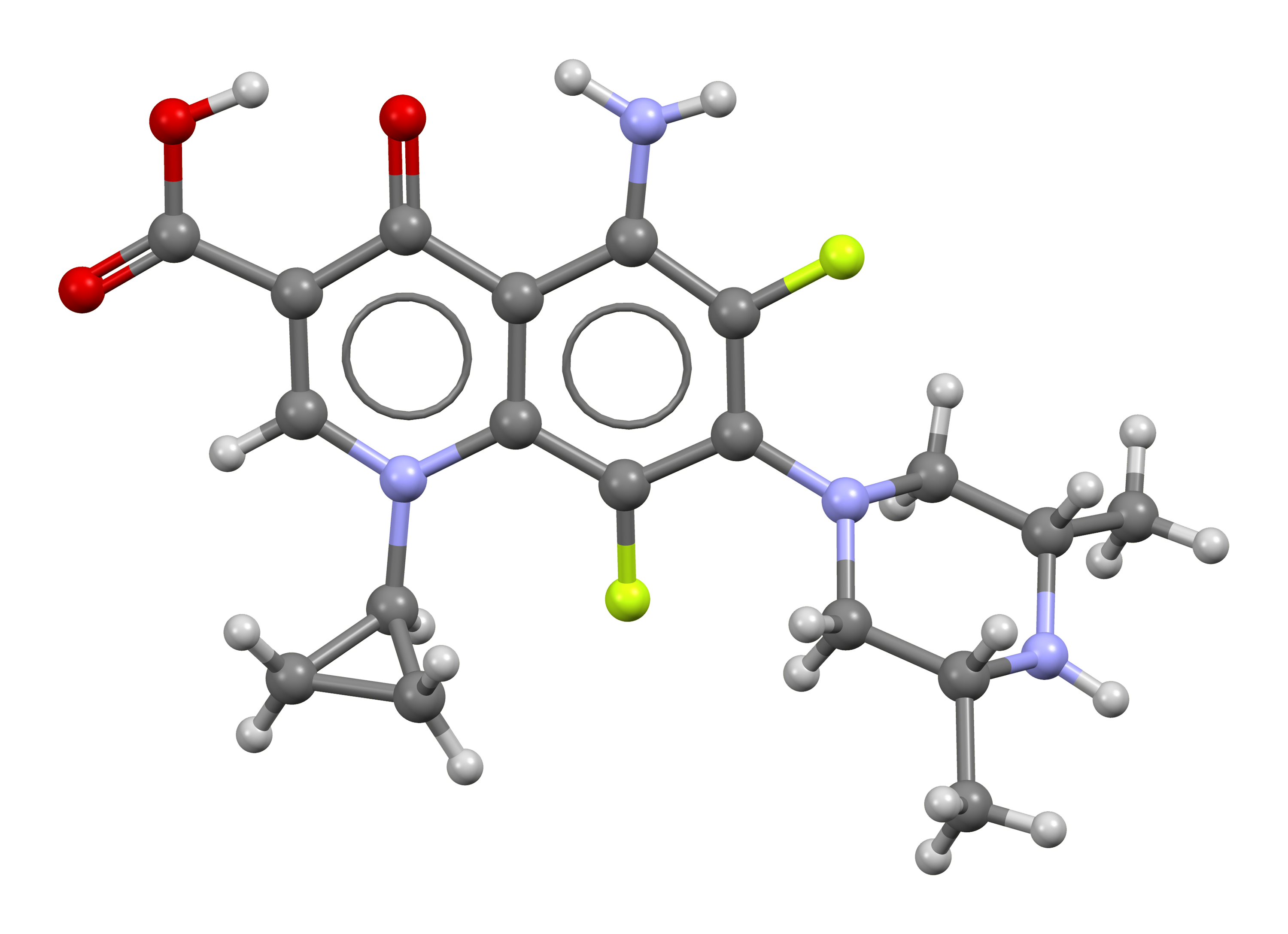

Clinical data
- Pronunciation: spar FLOX a sin
- Trade names: Spacin, Zagam, others
- AHFS/Drugs.com: Micromedex Detailed Consumer Information
- MedlinePlus: a600002
- Routes of administration: By mouth
- ATC code: J01MA09 (WHO)

Legal status
- Legal status: US: ℞-only

Pharmacokinetic data
- Bioavailability: 92%
- Protein binding: 45%
- Metabolism: Hepatic glucuronidation Cytochrome P450 system not involved
- Elimination half-life: 16 to 30 hours
- Excretion: Fecal (50%) and renal (50%)

Identifiers
- IUPAC name: 5-Amino-1-cyclopropyl-7-[(3R,5S)3,5-dimethylpiperazin-1-yl]-6,8-difluoro-4-oxo-quinoline-3-carboxylic acid
- CAS Number: 110871-86-8
- PubChem CID: 60464
- DrugBank: DB01208
- ChemSpider: 54517
- UNII: Q90AGA787L
- KEGG: D00590
- ChEBI: CHEBI:9212
- ChEMBL: ChEMBL850
- CompTox Dashboard (EPA): DTXSID9023590
- ECHA InfoCard: 100.157.238

Chemical and physical data
- Formula: C_{19}H_{22}F_{2}N_{4}O_{3}
- Molar mass: 392.407 g·mol^{−1}
- 3D model (JSmol): Interactive image
- Melting point: 266 to 269 °C (511 to 516 °F) (dec.)
- SMILES: C[C@@H]1CN(C[C@@H](N1)C)c2c(c(c3c(c2F)n(cc(c3=O)C(=O)O)C4CC4)N)F
- InChI: InChI=1S/C19H22F2N4O3/c1-8-5-24(6-9(2)23-8)17-13(20)15(22)12-16(14(17)21)25(10-3-4-10)7-11(18(12)26)19(27)28/h7-10,23H,3-6,22H2,1-2H3,(H,27,28)/t8-,9+; Key:DZZWHBIBMUVIIW-DTORHVGOSA-N

Sparfloxacin is a fluoroquinolone antibiotic used in the treatment of bacterial infections. It has a controversial safety profile.

It was patented in 1985 and approved for medical use in 1993. Zagam is no longer available in the United States.

== Medical uses ==
The compound is indicated for treating community-acquired lower respiratory tract infections (acute sinusitis, exacerbations of chronic bronchitis caused by susceptible bacteria, community-acquired pneumonia).

== Adverse reactions ==
- In a review of 2081 adult patients participating in a Phase III clinical trial of sparfloxacin in community-acquired, lower respiratory tract infections, sparfloxacin (200 or 400 mg loading dose then 100 or 200 mg daily; i.e. 200/100 mg and 400/200 mg) had a similar incidence of adverse events as the comparator agents (Rubinstein, 1996). The overall rates of drug-related adverse reactions for sparfloxacin 400/200 mg versus comparators and 200/100 mg versus the comparator (amoxicillin/clavulanic acid) were 13.7 versus 17.7%, and 9.5 versus 13.2%, respectively. However, many of these reported reactions were very minor; discontinuation of the antibacterial agent because of drug-related adverse reactions occurred in 1.6 versus 1.6%, and 1) versus 1.1%, respectively. Adverse reactions affecting the nervous system were reported in 5.7% of the sparfloxacin group, with insomnia and other sleep disorders the most common events.
- Phototoxicity was noted in 2.0% of sparfloxacin recipients, with the average delay in onset being 6.3 :t 4.5 days (range 1–14 days) after commencing sparfloxacin. Mostly this consisted of erythema on the face and hands which lasted an average of 6.4 :t 4.2 days. The incidence of phototoxicity associated with sparfloxacin appears to be higher than that observed with ciprofloxacin and ofloxacin but less than that reported for fleroxacin, pefloxacin, enoxacin and nalidixic acid.
- Most importantly, features of the hemolytic-uremic syndrome such as that associated with temaflox have not been reported.

== Pharmacological properties ==
Sparfloxacin is about 37-45% bound to proteins in the blood.

- Sparfloxacin achieves a high degree of penetration into most tissues, except for the central nervous system.
- Following a single 400 mg oral dose of sparfloxacin, the mean peak concentration in cantharides-induced inflammatory fluid is 1.3 lA-g per ml after a mean duration of 5 h post-dose. Thus, overall sparfloxacin penetration into inflammatory fluid is 117% and the mean elimination half-life from this fluid is 19.7 h.
- Skin penetration of sparfloxacin is good with skin:plasma ratios of 1.00 at 4 h (time of peak plasma concentration) and 1.39 at 5 h. Following single oral doses of 100 or 200 mg, concentrations in skin of 0.56 and 0.82–1.31 lA-g per g, respectively, can be expected. Sparfloxacin achieves excellent penetration into human polymorphonuclear leukocytes in vitro.
- Sparfloxacin achieves high concentrations in respiratory and sinus tissues. Following an oral loading dose of 400 mg followed by 200 mg daily, mean concentrations of sparfloxacin (2.5 to 5 h after dosing) in bronchial mucosa, epithelial lining fluid and alveolar macrophages are 4.4 μg/g, 15.0 μg/mL and 53.7 μg/g, respectively. The mean sparfloxacin concentration in maxillary sinus mucosa, 2–5 h after a single 400 mg dose, is 5.8 μg/g.

Shimada et al. ( 1993) has summarized many of the studies published in Japanese regarding the tissue distribution of sparfloxacin. (high concentrations are achieved in sputum, pleural fluid, skin, lung, prostate, gynecological tissues, breast milk and otolaryngological tissues. *Salivary concentrations are 66 to 70% of plasma levels, while CSF penetration appears to be somewhat limited with CSF:plasma concentration ratios of only 0.25 to 0.35.

- Sparfloxacin achieves concentrations in bile and gallbladder of 7.1- to 83-fold the concurrent serum levels.

In rabbits, sparfloxacin achieves very good penetration into the ocular vitreous (54%), cornea (76%) and lens (36%).

== Mechanism of action ==
Sparfloxacin, like other quinolones and fluoroquinolones, are bactericidal drugs, actively killing bacteria. Quinolones inhibit the bacterial DNA gyrase or the topoisomerase IV enzyme, thereby inhibiting DNA replication and transcription. Quinolones can enter cells easily and therefore are often used to treat intracellular pathogens such as Legionella pneumophila and Mycoplasma pneumoniae. For many gram-negative bacteria DNA gyrase is the target, whereas topoisomerase IV is the target for many gram-positive bacteria. Eukaryotic cells do not contain DNA gyrase or topoisomerase IV.
