= Lomefloxacin =

Chemical compound

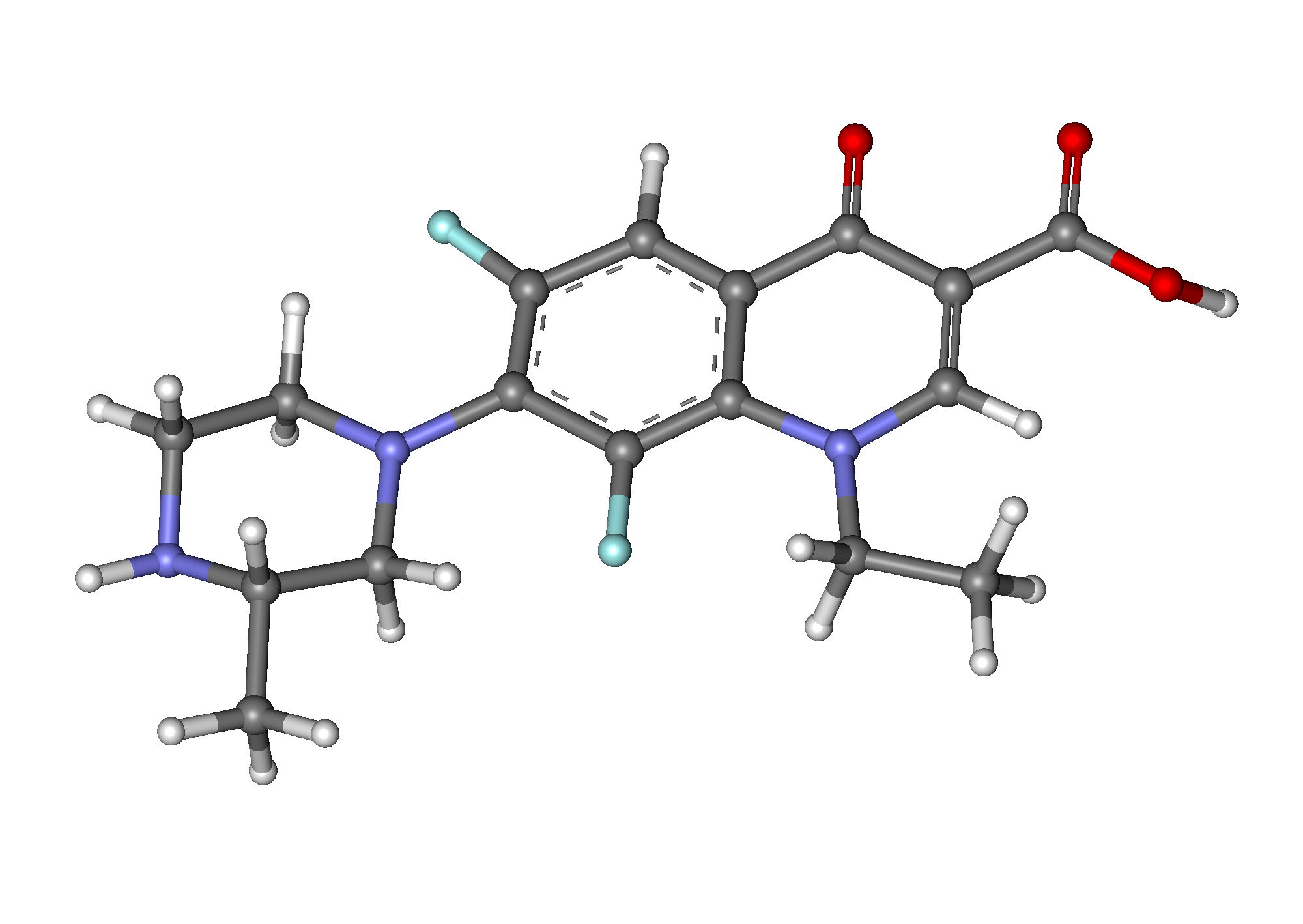

Clinical data
- Trade names: Maxaquin
- AHFS/Drugs.com: Consumer Drug Information
- MedlinePlus: a600002
- ATC code: J01MA07 (WHO) J04AM09 (WHO), S01AE04 (WHO)

Pharmacokinetic data
- Protein binding: 10%
- Elimination half-life: 8 hours

Identifiers
- IUPAC name: (RS)-1-Ethyl-6,8-difluoro-7-(3-methylpiperazin-1-yl)-4-oxo-quinoline-3-carboxylic acid
- CAS Number: 98079-51-7; HCl: 98079-52-8
- PubChem CID: 3948
- DrugBank: DB00978
- ChemSpider: 3811
- UNII: L6BR2WJD8V; HCl: 9VC7S3ZXXB
- KEGG: D02318
- ChEBI: CHEBI:116278
- ChEMBL: ChEMBL561
- CompTox Dashboard (EPA): DTXSID4040680
- ECHA InfoCard: 100.117.399

Chemical and physical data
- Formula: C_{17}H_{19}F_{2}N_{3}O_{3}
- Molar mass: 351.354 g·mol^{−1}
- 3D model (JSmol): Interactive image
- Melting point: 239 to 240.5 °C (462.2 to 464.9 °F)
- SMILES: Fc1c(c(F)c2c(c1)C(=O)C(\C(=O)O)=C/N2CC)N3CC(NCC3)C
- InChI: InChI=1S/C17H19F2N3O3/c1-3-21-8-11(17(24)25)16(23)10-6-12(18)15(13(19)14(10)21)22-5-4-20-9(2)7-22/h6,8-9,20H,3-5,7H2,1-2H3,(H,24,25); Key:ZEKZLJVOYLTDKK-UHFFFAOYSA-N

Lomefloxacin hydrochloride (sold under the following brand names in English-speaking countries Maxaquin, Okacyn, Uniquin) is a fluoroquinolone antibiotic used to treat bacterial infections including bronchitis and urinary tract infections. It is also used to prevent urinary tract infections prior to surgery. Lomefloxacin is associated with phototoxicity and central nervous system adverse effects.

In October 2008, the FDA added the following black box warning to the product insert for Maxaquin: "Lomefloxacin is unique in that it forms a magnesium chelate with itself. The chelate is formed between the 2-carbonyl group of two separate lomefloxacin molecules."

It was patented in 1983 and approved for medical use in 1989.
