= Loracarbef =

Chemical compound

Clinical data
- Trade names: Lorabid
- AHFS/Drugs.com: Monograph
- MedlinePlus: a601206
- ATC code: J01DC08 (WHO)

Pharmacokinetic data
- Protein binding: 25%

Identifiers
- IUPAC name: (6R,7S)-7-[[(2S)-2-amino-2-phenylacetyl]amino]-3-chloro-8-oxo-1-azabicyclo[4.2.0]oct-2-ene-2-carboxylic acid
- CAS Number: 76470-66-1
- PubChem CID: 5284584
- DrugBank: DB00447
- ChemSpider: 4447634
- UNII: W72I5ZT78Z
- KEGG: D08143
- ChEMBL: ChEMBL1013
- CompTox Dashboard (EPA): DTXSID7023223

Chemical and physical data
- Formula: C_{16}H_{16}ClN_{3}O_{4}
- Molar mass: 349.77 g·mol^{−1}
- 3D model (JSmol): Interactive image
- SMILES: O=C(C(N12)=C(Cl)CC[C@]2([H])[C@H](NC([C@H](N)C3=CC=CC=C3)=O)C1=O)O
- InChI: InChI=1S/C16H16ClN3O4.H2O/c17-9-6-7-10-12(15(22)20(10)13(9)16(23)24)19-14(21)11(18)8-4-2-1-3-5-8;/h1-5,10-12H,6-7,18H2,(H,19,21)(H,23,24);1H2/t10-,11-,12+;/m1./s1; Key:GPYKKBAAPVOCIW-HSASPSRMSA-N

Loracarbef is an antibiotic. It is a carbacephem, but it is sometimes grouped together with the second-generation cephalosporin antibiotics. Loracarbef is a synthetic "carba" analog of cefaclor, and is more stable.

== History ==
Loracarbef received FDA approval in 1991 and it was marketed under the trade name Lorabid. Its use was discontinued in 2006.

== Usage & indications ==
Loracarbef was used to treat infections of the lungs, maxillary sinuses, throat, skin, and urinary tract.

=== Spectrum of activity ===
Loracarbef had broad spectrum effectiveness against both gram-negative and gram-positive bacteria, including those precipitating infections of the respiratory tract, sinuses, tonsils, skin, urinary tract, and kidneys. It was of specific use in those infections caused by Escherichia coli, Streptococcus pyogenes, Staphylococcus aureus, Staphylococcus saprophyticus, Streptococcus pneumoniae, Haemophilus influenzae and Moraxella catarrhalis.

== Side effects ==
Diarrhea is the most common adverse effect with loracarbef. Side effects are more frequently seen with children under the age of twelve.
