= Cefepime/sulbactam =

Combination antibiotics

Combination of
- Cefepime: Cephalosporin
- Sulbactam: Beta-lactamase inhibitor

Clinical data
- Trade names: Maxictam-AF
- ATC code: J01DE51 (WHO)

Legal status
- Legal status: Rx in several countries

Cefepime/sulbactam is a 1:1 fixed-dose combination of cefepime (a fourth-generation cephalosporin) and sulbactam (a β-lactamase inhibitor). The combination exerts a bactericidal effect by disrupting bacterial cell wall synthesis through transpeptidase inhibition, thereby impairing peptidoglycan cross-linking. It was developed in 2006 by Russian researchers.

Cefepime/sulbactam was approved for medical use in Russia in 2019 and is also registered in Belarus, Armenia, Azerbaijan, Uzbekistan, Kyrgyzstan and Mongolia under the trade name Maxictam-AF.

== Pharmacology ==
- Cefepime: a broad-spectrum cephalosporin with stability against AmpC β-lactamases and some carbapenemases (e.g., NmcA). It targets penicillin-binding proteins (PBPs) but lacks activity against ESBLs.
- Sulbactam: a β-lactamase inhibitor that irreversibly inactivates class β-lactamases, including ESBLs, and exhibits intrinsic activity against Acinetobacter baumannii by binding PBPs.

== Microbiological spectrum ==
Cefepime/sulbactam demonstrates enhanced in vitro activity against:

- Gram-positive aerobes: Staphylococcus aureus, Streptococcus spp.
- Gram-negative aerobes:
1. Acinetobacter baumannii (including carbapenem-resistant strains).
2. Klebsiella pneumoniae (ESBL and carbapenemase producers).
3. Pseudomonas aeruginosa, Enterobacter, Escherichia coli.
- Anaerobes: Bacteroides fragilis.

== Efficacy ==
From October 2019 till March 2020, an open multicenter, observational study of the use of the antibiotic cefepime/sulbactam was conducted by S.V. Yakovlev, M.P. Suvorova, and A.O. Bykov. The study was conducted in 14 clinics in the Russian Federation among patients with abdominal infection, nosocomial pneumonia, or pneumonia associated with ventilator-associated pneumonia. Zhuravlyova M. V., Vasilyuk V.B., Gorelov D.S. and coauthors conducted an open randomized comparative study to study the efficacy and safety of cefepime/sulbactam and cefepime for the treatment of acute pyelonephritis. The aim of the studies: to investigate in real clinical practice the efficacy of antibiotic in patients with abdominal infection, nosocomial pneumonia (NP) or ventilator-associated pneumonia (VAP-associated pneumonia). Clinical efficacy and safety of cefepime/sulbactam correspond to those of cefepime, which is widely used in clinical practice for the same indications. The combination of cefepime and sulbactam may be the best option to replace carbapenems in clinical practice. According to studies, the bioavailability of the drug is 100%. This efficacy is particularly noted:

- Community-acquired pyelonephritis: 97.9% clinical and bacteriological efficacy.
- Nosocomial infections:
  1. Intra-abdominal infections: 78.4% efficacy.
  2. Hospital-acquired pneumonia (HAP): 90.3% efficacy.
  3. Ventilator-associated pneumonia (VAP): 80.7% efficacy.
- Comparative studies:
  1. Cefepime/sulbactam vs. carbapenems in severe infections (including sepsis) showed comparable efficacy (71% vs. 62%) but lower rates of carbapenem-resistant strain selection (20% vs. 74.5%)

== Advantages ==
This antibiotic is an alternative to carbapenems, which reduces the risk of carbapenem resistance. Its efficacy is comparable to carbapenems but with a lower risk of superinfection. Cefepime/sulbactam is suitable for implementing a strategy to contain antibiotic resistance.

- Carbapenem-sparing effect: reduces selection pressure for carbapenem-resistant A. baumannii and K. pneumoniae.
- Lower risk of superinfection (22.2% vs. 53.3% with carbapenems).
- Effective against ESBL and AmpC producers, offering an alternative to ceftazidime-avibactam and meropenem-vaborbactam.

== Future directions ==
- Combination therapy: Synergistic effects observed with amikacin and aztreonam against P. aeruginosa and A. baumannii.
- New β-lactamase inhibitors: LN-1-255 (a penicillin-sulfone inhibitor) reduces MICs of cefepime/sulbactam against carbapenem-resistant A. baumannii.
