= Nadifloxacin =

Chemical compound

Clinical data
- AHFS/Drugs.com: International Drug Names
- Routes of administration: topical (epicutaneous)
- ATC code: D10AF05 (WHO)

Identifiers
- IUPAC name: (RS)-9-Fluoro-8-(4-hydroxy-piperidin-1-yl)-5-methyl-1-oxo-6,7-dihydro-1H,5H-pyrido[3,2,1-ij]quinoline-2-carboxylic acid
- CAS Number: 124858-35-1
- PubChem CID: 4410
- ChemSpider: 4257
- UNII: 6CL9Y5YZEQ
- CompTox Dashboard (EPA): DTXSID5046483
- ECHA InfoCard: 100.166.530

Chemical and physical data
- Formula: C_{19}H_{21}FN_{2}O_{4}
- Molar mass: 360.385 g·mol^{−1}
- 3D model (JSmol): Interactive image
- Chirality: Racemic mixture
- Melting point: 245 to 247 °C (473 to 477 °F) (dec.)
- SMILES: CC1CCc2c(N3CCC(O)CC3)c(F)cc3c(=O)c(C(=O)O)cn1c23
- InChI: InChI=1S/C19H21FN2O4/c1-10-2-3-12-16-13(18(24)14(19(25)26)9-22(10)16)8-15(20)17(12)21-6-4-11(23)5-7-21/h8-11,23H,2-7H2,1H3,(H,25,26); Key:JYJTVFIEFKZWCJ-UHFFFAOYSA-N

Nadifloxacin (INN, brand names Acuatim, Nadiflox, Nadoxin, Nadixa, Activon) is a topical fluoroquinolone antibiotic for the treatment of acne vulgaris. It is also used to treat bacterial skin infections.

== Pharmacology ==
=== Antibacterial spectrum ===
In vitro studies of nadifloxacin showed potent and broad-spectrum antibacterial activity against aerobic Gram-positive, Gram-negative and anaerobic bacteria, including Cutibacterium acnes and Staphylococcus epidermidis. Nadifloxacinshowed potent antibacterial activity against methicillin-resistant Staphylococcus aureus (MRSA), which was similar to potency against methicillin-sensitive Staphylococcus aureus (MSSA). The drug was also active against new quinolone-resistant MRSA. Nadifloxacin does not show cross-resistance with other new fluoroquinolones.

=== Mechanism of action ===
Nadifloxacin inhibits the enzyme DNA gyrase that is involved in bacterial DNA synthesis and replication, thus inhibiting the bacterial multiplication. Nadifloxacin in addition to determine a therapeutic antibacterial action, can have a sebostatic and anti-inflammatory action, thus contributing to the improvement of the clinical condition of the patient.

=== Pharmacokinetics ===
Following a single topical application of 10 g nadifloxacin 1% cream to normal human back skin, the highest plasma concentration was determined to be 107 ng/mL with an elimination half-life of 19.4 hours. Approximately 0.09% of the administered dose was excreted in the urine over 48 hours post- dosing. The plasma concentration reached a steady state on Day 5 of repeated administration study when nadifloxacin 1% cream was applied at 5 g twice daily to normal healthy individuals for a period of 7 days. The plasma concentration reached a peak of 4.1 ng/ml at 8 hours post-final dosing with an elimination half-life of 23.2 hours. The urinary excretion rate reached 0.16% on Day 7.

== Clinical use ==
In some European countries, the drug has been approved for the treatment of acne vulgaris. In a 2013 multicenter, randomized clinical study with a total of 184 Japanese patients with moderate to severe acne, adapalene 0.1% gel plus nadifloxacin 1% cream (combination therapy) showed a significant efficacy in decrement of inflammatory papulopustular lesions. In patients with skin lesions, topical application of nadifloxacin can result in plasma concentrations of 1 to 3 ng/ml. Consequently, some authors argued that it should not be used to treat relatively harmless diseases like acne vulgaris, risking the development of quinolone resistances.

== Adverse effects ==
During the treatment some patients may develop some adverse effects predominantly of the skin and subcutaneous tissue: burning and itching (in absolute the most common side effect), contact dermatitis, dryness and skin irritation.
