= Virginiamycin =

Combination antimicrobial

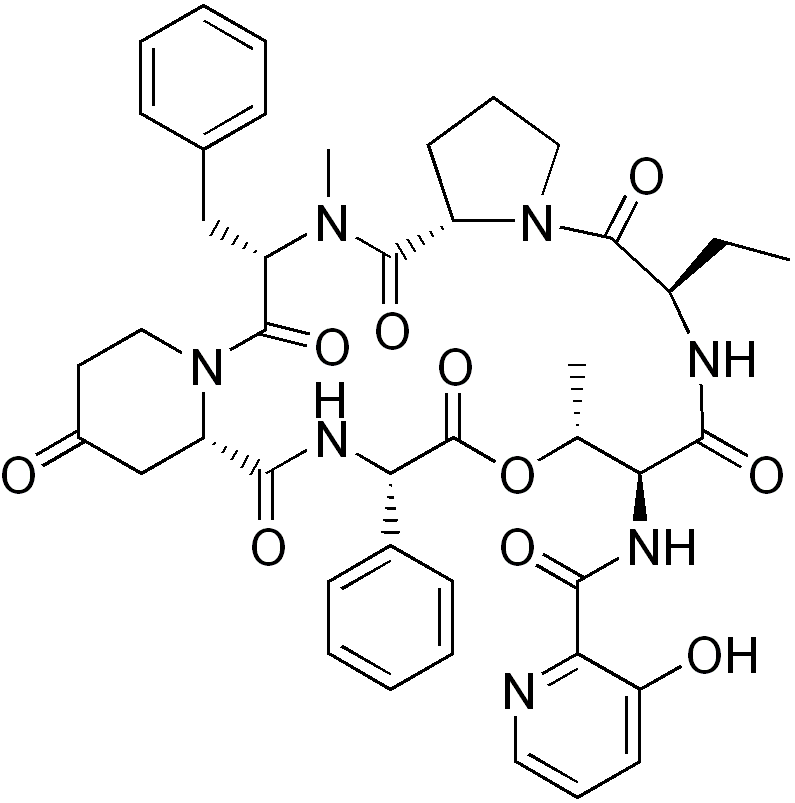

Combination of
- Virginiamycin S1: streptogramin B antibiotic
- Pristinamycin IIA: streptogramin A antibiotic

Clinical data
- AHFS/Drugs.com: FDA Professional Drug Information
- MedlinePlus: a603007
- ATC code: D06AX10 (WHO) QJ01FG90 (WHO)

Identifiers
- CAS Number: 11006-76-1
- DrugBank: DB01669
- UNII: C49WS9N75L
- KEGG: D06311
- ChEBI: CHEBI:87209
- NIAID ChemDB: 008734
- E number: E711 (antibiotics)
- CompTox Dashboard (EPA): DTXSID30873800
- ECHA InfoCard: 100.031.119

Chemical and physical data
- Melting point: 138 to 140 °C (280 to 284 °F) (dec.)

Virginiamycin is a streptogramin antibiotic similar to pristinamycin and quinupristin/dalfopristin. It is a combination of pristinamycin IIA (virginiamycin M1) and virginiamycin S1. Virginiamycin is used in the fuel ethanol industry to prevent microbial contamination. It is also used in agriculture, specifically in livestock, to accelerate the growth of the animals and to prevent and treat infections. Antibiotics also save as much as 30% in feed costs among young swine, although the savings fade as pigs get older, according to a USDA study.
