= Lincosamides =

Group of antibiotics

Lincomycin

Clindamycin (note chlorine atom compared to lincomycin)

Lincosamides are a class of antibiotics, which include lincomycin, clindamycin, and pirlimycin.

== Structure ==
Lincosamides consist of a pyrrolidine ring linked to a pyranose moiety (methylthio-lincosamide) via an amide bond. Hydrolysis of lincosamides, specifically lincomycin, splits the molecule into its building blocks of the sugar and proline moieties. Both of these derivatives can conversely be recombined into the drug itself or a derivative.

== Synthesis ==
Biosynthesis of lincosamides occurs through a biphasic pathway, in which propylproline and methylthiolincosamide are independently synthesized immediately before condensation of the two precursor molecules. Condensation of the propylproline carboxyl group with the methylthiolincosamide amine group via an amide bond forms N-demethyllincomycin. N-Demethyllincomycin is subsequently methylated via S-adenosyl methionine to produce lincomycin A.

Lincomycin is naturally produced by bacteria species, namely Streptomyces lincolnensis, S. roseolus, and S. caelestis. Clindamycin is derived via (7S)-chloro-substitution of the (7R)-hydroxyl group of lincomycin. Lincomycin is primarily isolated from fermentations of Streptomyces lincolnensis, while clindamycin is prepared semi-synthetically. While several hundred synthetic and semi-synthetic derivatives of lincosamides have been prepared, only lincomycin A and clindamycin are used in clinical practice due to issues with toxicity and low biological activity in other lincosamide antibiotics.

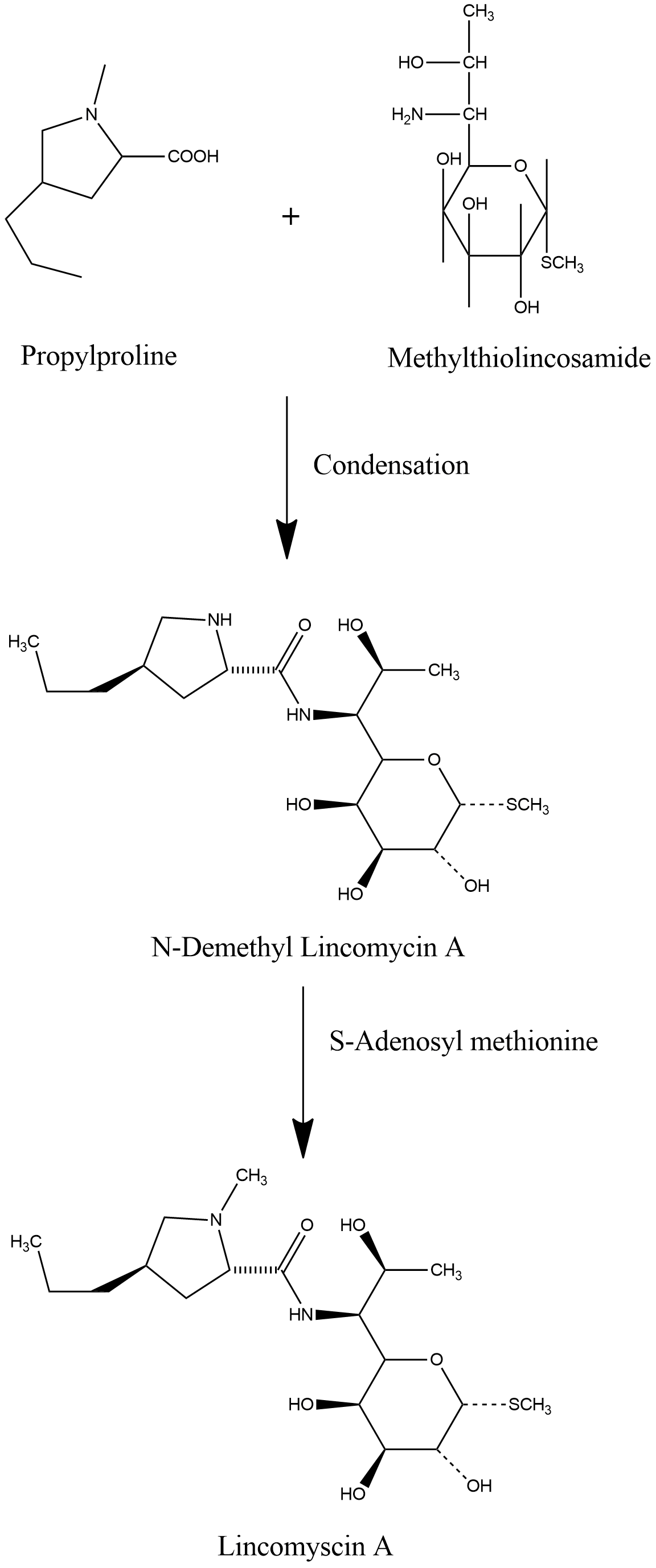
Chemical synthesis of lincomycin A. Propylproline and methylthio-lincosamide are joined via a condensation reaction. This reaction forms N-demethyllincomycin A, which is methylated via S-adenosylmethionine to form lincomycin A.

== Mechanism of action ==
Lincosamides prevent bacterial replication in a bacteriostatic mechanism by interfering with the synthesis of proteins.

In a mechanism similar to macrolides and streptogramin B, lincosamides bind close to the peptidyl transferase center on the 23S portion of the 50S subunit of bacterial ribosomes. Under the influence of high resolution X-ray, structures of clindamycin and ribosomal subunits from bacterium have previously revealed exclusive binding to the 23S segment of the peptidyl transferase cavity. Binding is mediated by the mycarose sugar moiety which has partially overlapping substrates with peptidyl transferase. By extending to the peptidyl transferase center, lincosamides cause the premature dissociation of peptidyl-tRNA's containing two, three or four amino acid residues. In this case, peptides will grow to a certain point until steric hindrance inhibits peptidyl transferase activity. Lincosamides do not interfere with protein synthesis in human cells (or those of other eukaryotes) due to structural differences between prokaryotic and eukaryotic ribosomes. Lincosamides are used against Gram-positive bacteria since they are unable to pass through the porins of Gram-negative bacteria.

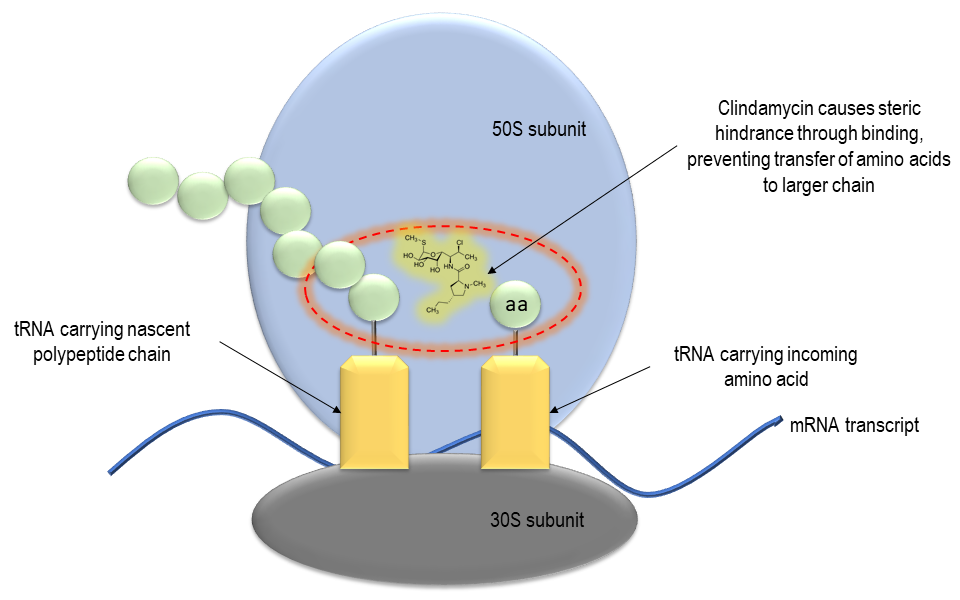
Clindamycin, a commonly used lincosamide, binds the 50s subunit and causes steric hindrance which inhibits the transfer of amino acids to the longer polypeptide chain.

== Resistance ==
=== Ribosomal methylation ===
Soon after the emergence of clinical lincosamide use in 1953, strains of resistant staphylococci were isolated in several countries including France, Japan and the United States. Resistant strains were characterized by expression of methyltransferases which dimethylate residues within the 23S subunit of ribosomal RNA, preventing binding of macrolides, lincosamides and streptogramins B. The gene family responsible for encoding of these methyltransferases is referred to as the "erm" family, or erythromycin ribosome methylase family of genes. Nearly 40 erm genes have been reported to date, which are transferred primarily through plasmids and transposons.

=== Target mutation ===
Several strains of bacteria which are highly resistant to macrolide treatment have been isolated and found to possess mutations at the transferase binding pocket in the 23S ribosomal subunit. Macrolide-resistant Streptococcus pneumoniae isolated from hospital patients in Eastern Europe and North America were found to contain mutations in either 23S or other ribosomal protein genes.

=== Antibiotic efflux ===
Gram-negative bacteria harbor genes encoding for molecular pumps which can contribute to resistance of hydrophobic compounds like macrolides and lincosamides. Out of the many families of multidrug resistance pumps, lincosamides are most commonly shunted through pumps belonging to the resistance-nodulation-cell division superfamily. Staphylococci express efflux pumps with specificity for 14 and 15 member ring macrolides and streptogramin B, but not lincosamide molecules.

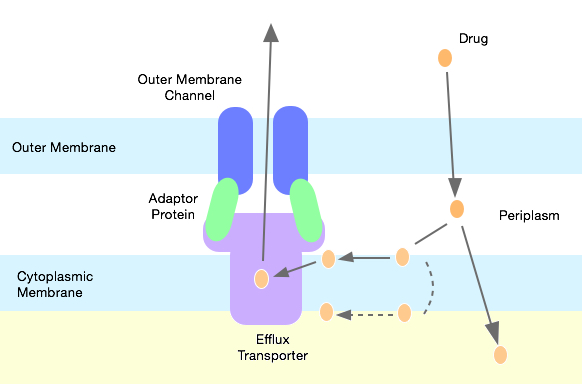
Example of drug efflux through a pump belonging to the resistance-nodulation-cell division superfamily, the type of pump primarily responsible for lincosamide efflux.

=== Drug modification ===
Clinical isolates of S. aureus harboring genes which encode for lincosamide nucleotransferases have been reported. Genes lnuA and lnuB confer resistance to lincomycin, but not clindamycin. These genes, however, limit the bacteriostatic activity of clindamycin. This type of resistance is rare in S. aureus, but has been reported to be more prevalent in other bacteria strains.

== Pharmacokinetics ==
Approximately 90% of orally administered lincosamides are absorbed, with slight variance depending on which drug is given. Plasma concentrations via this route peak within 2–4 hours. Intramuscular administration of lincosamides results in strong absorption, with peak plasma levels being reached in 1–2 hours. Around 90% of clindamycin is bound to plasma proteins, and is generally more stable and rapidly absorbed than lincomycin.

Lincosamides have a broad distribution in several tissues, excluding cerebrospinal fluid. When administered intramuscularly to rats, lincomycin was found to accumulate in highest concentrations in the kidneys when compared to other tissues, while clindamycin was found in highest concentrations within the lungs. Clindamycin accumulates in macrophages and other white blood cells, which can result in concentrations 50 times higher than plasma levels.

== Clinical use ==
Lincosamides are often used clinically as an alternative antibiotic for patients who are allergic to penicillin. Of the lincosamides, clindamycin is most commonly used within the clinic due to its higher bioavailability, higher oral absorption and efficacy within the target organism spectrum. Lincosamides are generally the first-choice use antibiotic class in veterinary microbiology, most commonly used to combat skin infections.

Potential clinical uses for lincosamide antibiotics in humans are numerous. They are efficacious in the treatment of dental infections, abdominal infections, abscesses, pelvic inflammatory disease and anaerobic infections. Clindamycin alone has been shown to be efficacious in the treatment of acne, toxic shock syndrome and malaria, and to decrease the risk of premature births in women with bacterial vaginosis. Lincosamide antibiotics may also be useful in the treatment of methicillin-resistant S. aureus.

== Toxicity and interactions ==
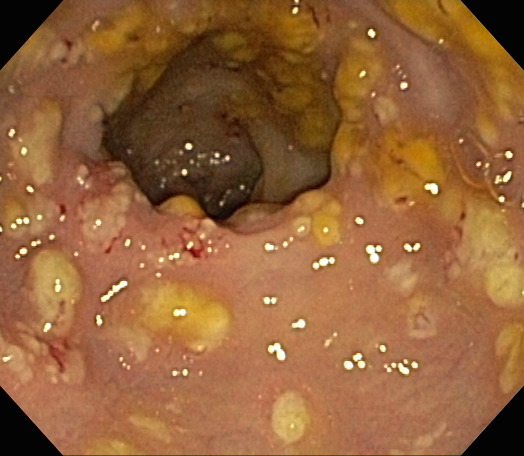
Endoscopic image of pseudomembranous enterocollitis within the intestinal tract. Disruption of gastrointestinal flora and subsequent observed pathology can result from clindamycin administration.

While there have been no reports of severe organ toxicity from lincosamide treatment, gastrointestinal disturbances have been associated with their administration. Pseudomembranous enterocolitis resulting from clindamycin-induced disruption of gastrointestinal flora can be a lethal adverse event observed in several species when used in the veterinary clinic, particularly in horses. At extremely high doses of clindamycin, skeletal muscle paralysis has been demonstrated in several species. Lincosamides can interact with anesthetic agents to produce neuromuscular effects.

Other adverse reactions include diarrhea, nausea, vomiting, abdominal pain and rash. Topical administration of clindamycin may induce contact dermatitis, dryness, burning, itching, scaliness and peeling of the skin.

== Lincosamide brand name formulations ==
- Clindamycin - Cleocin, Cleocin Pediatric, ClindaMax Vaginal, Dalacin
- Lincomycin - Lincocin
- Pirlimycin

== History ==
The first lincosamide compound discovered was lincomycin, isolated from Streptomyces lincolnensis in a soil sample from Lincoln, Nebraska (hence the bacterial name).
