= Dalfopristin =

Chemical compound

Clinical data
- AHFS/Drugs.com: International Drug Names
- MedlinePlus: a603007
- ATC code: none

Legal status
- Legal status: US: ℞-only

Pharmacokinetic data
- Elimination half-life: 1 hour

Identifiers
- IUPAC name: (3R,4R,5E,10E,12E,14S,26R,26aS)-26-[[2-(diethylamino)ethyl]sulfonyl]-8,9,14,15,24,25,26,26a- octahydro-14-hydroxy-3-isopropyl-4,12-dimethyl-3H-21,18-nitrilo-1H,22H-pyrrolo[2,1-c][1,8,4,19]-dioxadiazacyclotetracosine-1,7,16,22(4H,17H)-tetrone
- CAS Number: 112362-50-2
- PubChem CID: 6435782
- DrugBank: DB01764
- ChemSpider: 16736919
- UNII: R9M4FJE48E
- KEGG: D00853
- ChEBI: CHEBI:4309
- ChEMBL: ChEMBL1200937
- CompTox Dashboard (EPA): DTXSID10869549

Chemical and physical data
- Formula: C_{34}H_{50}N_{4}O_{9}S
- Molar mass: 690.85 g·mol^{−1}
- 3D model (JSmol): Interactive image
- SMILES: CCN(CC)CCS(=O)(=O)[C@@H]1CCN2[C@H]1C(=O)O[C@@H]([C@@H](/C=C/C(=O)NC/C=C/C(=C/[C@H](CC(=O)CC3=NC(=CO3)C2=O)O)/C)C)C(C)C
- InChI: InChI=1S/C34H50N4O9S/c1-7-37(8-2)16-17-48(44,45)28-13-15-38-31(28)34(43)47-32(22(3)4)24(6)11-12-29(41)35-14-9-10-23(5)18-25(39)19-26(40)20-30-36-27(21-46-30)33(38)42/h9-12,18,21-22,24-25,28,31-32,39H,7-8,13-17,19-20H2,1-6H3,(H,35,41)/b10-9+,12-11+,23-18+/t24-,25-,28-,31-,32-/m1/s1; Key:SUYRLXYYZQTJHF-VMBLUXKRSA-N

Dalfopristin is a semi-synthetic streptogramin antibiotic analogue of ostreogyrcin A (virginiamycin M, pristinamycin IIA, streptogramin A). The combination quinupristin/dalfopristin (marketed under the trade name Synercid) was brought to the market by Rhone-Poulenc Rorer Pharmaceuticals in 1999. Synercid (weight-to-weight ratio of 30% quinupristin to 70% dalfopristin) is used to treat infections by staphylococci and by vancomycin-resistant Enterococcus faecium.

== Synthesis ==
Through the addition of diethylaminoethylthiol to the 2-pyrroline group and oxidation of the sulfate of ostreogrycin A, a structurally more hydrophobic compound is formed. This hydrophobic compound contains a readily ionizable group that is available for salt formation.

== Large Scale Preparation ==
Dalfopristin is synthesized from pristinamycine IIa through achieving a stereoselective Michael-type addition of 2-diethylaminoethanethiol on the conjugated double bond of the dehydroproline ring . The first method found was using sodium periodate associated with ruthenium dioxide to directly oxidize the sulfur derivative into a sulfone. However, using hydrogen peroxide with sodium tungstate in a 2-phase medium produces an improved yield, and is therefore the method of choice for large scale production.

The production of the dalfopristin portion of quinupristin/dalfopristin is achieved through purifying cocrystallization of the quinupristin and dalfopristin from acetone solutions.

== Physical Characteristics (as mesylate salt) ==
Appearance	White to yellow solid
Physical state	Solid
Solubility	Soluble in ethanol, methanol, DMSO, DMF, and water (0.072 mg/ml)
Storage	-20 °C
Boiling point	940.5 °C at 760 mmHg
Melting point	150 °C
Density	1.27 g/cm^{3}
Refractive index	n20D 1.58
pK values	pKa: 13.18 (Predicted), pKb: 8.97 (Predicted)

== Antimicrobial activity ==
Alone, both dalfopristin and quinupristin have modest in vitro bacteriostatic activity. However, 8-16 times higher in vitro bactericidal activity is seen against many gram-positive bacteria when the two streptogramins are combined . While quinupristin/dalfopristin is effective against staphylococci and vancomycin-resistant Enterococcus faecium, in vitro studies have not demonstrated bactericidal activity against all strains and species of common gram-positive bacteria.

== Mechanism of action ==
Both dalfopristin and quinupristin bind to sites located on the 50S subunit of the ribosome. Initial dalfopristin binding results in a conformational change of the ribosome, allowing for increased binding by quinupristin. A stable drug-ribosome complex is created when the two drugs are used together. This complex inhibits protein synthesis through prevention of peptide-chain formation and blocking the extrusion of newly formed peptide chains. In many cases, this leads to bacterial cell death.

== Mechanism of resistance ==
Streptogramin resistance is mediated through enzymatic drug inactivation, efflux or active transport of drug out of the cell, and most commonly, conformational alterations in ribosomal target binding sites. Enzymatic drug inactivation may occur in staphylococcal and enterococcal species through production of dalfopristin-inactivating acetyltransferase or quinupristin-inactivating hydrolase. Efflux or active transport of the drug may occur in coagulase-negative staphylococci and Enterococcus faecium. Constitutive ribosome modification has been seen in staphylococci with resistance seen in quinupristin only.

While resistance to dalfopristin may be conferred via a single point of mutation, quinupristin/dalfopristin offers the benefit of requiring multiple points of mutation targeting both dalfopristin and quinupristin components to confer drug resistance. Comparatively, only 2-5% of staphylococcal isolates collected in France show resistance to a related streptogramin, pristinamycin, in over 35 years of use.

== Drug interactions ==
Both dalfopristin and quinupristin are extensively hepatically metabolized, excreted from the feces, and serve as an inhibitor of cytochrome P450 (CYP) 3A4 enzyme pathway. Caution should be taken with concommitent use with drugs metabolized by the CYP3A4 pathway. Concomitant use of quinupristin/dalfopristin with cyclosporine for 2–5 days has shown to result in a two-fold increase in cyclosporine levels.

No adverse effects have been seen in patients with hepatic impairment and no recommendations by the manufacturer have been made for dose reduction of quinupristin/dalfopristin in this patient population.

== Commercialization ==
While little information is available regarding the regulatory and commercialization history of Dalfopristin alone, Synercid (quinupristin/dalfopristin), made by Rhone-Poulenc Rorer Pharmaceuticals, was approved in 1999 as an IV injectable for the treatment of vancomycin resistant Enterococcus faecium and complicated skin and skin structure infections. Dalfopristin can be purchased alone on the internet from various chemical manufacturers as a mesylate salt.
