= Linopristin =

Names
- Systematic IUPAC name N-[(6R,9S,10R,13S,15aS,22S,24aS)-22-{[4-(Dimethylamino)phenyl]methyl}-6-ethyl-10,23-dimethyl-18-[(morpholin-4-yl)methyl]-5,8,12,15,21,24-hexaoxo-13-phenyl-1,2,3,5,6,7,8,9,10,13,14,15,15a,16,19,21,22,23,24,24a-icosahydro-12H-pyrido[2,1-f]pyrrolo[2,1-l][1,4,7,10,13,16]oxapentaazacyclononadecin-9-yl]-3-hydroxypyridine-2-carboxamide
- Other names RPR 202698; RPR 202868

Identifiers
CAS Number	325965-23-9
3D model (JSmol)	Interactive image
ChemSpider	8095069
ECHA InfoCard	100.218.103
PubChem CID	9919429
UNII	312V80FR4J
CompTox Dashboard (EPA)	DTXSID10186288
- InChI: InChI=1S/C50H63N9O10/c1-6-36-47(64)58-23-11-14-38(58)48(65)56(5)39(28-32-16-19-35(20-17-32)55(3)4)49(66)59-30-33(29-57-24-26-68-27-25-57)18-21-37(59)44(61)54-42(34-12-8-7-9-13-34)50(67)69-31(2)41(45(62)52-36)53-46(63)43-40(60)15-10-22-51-43/h7-10,12-13,15-20,22,31,36-39,41-42,60H,6,11,14,21,23-30H2,1-5H3,(H,52,62)(H,53,63)(H,54,61)/t31-,36-,37+,38+,39+,41+,42+/m1/s1 Key: NVGNYGXBILPHOS-VXNAYKIUSA-N
- SMILES: O=C([C@H](CC1=CC=C(N(C)C)C=C1)N(C)C([C@H]2N(CCC2)C3=O)=O)N4[C@H](C(N[C@H](C(O[C@H](C)[C@@H](C(N[C@@H]3CC)=O)NC(C5=NC=CC=C5O)=O)=O)C6=CC=CC=C6)=O)CC=C(CN7CCOCC7)C4

Properties
Chemical formula	C_{50}H_{63}N_{9}O_{10}
Molar mass	950.107 g·mol^{−1}
- Except where otherwise noted, data are given for materials in their standard state (at 25 °C [77 °F], 100 kPa). Infobox references

Linopristin is an antibiotic of the streptogramin B class. It has been described as a pristinamycin IA derivative, though it is actually more similar to quinupristin. NCATS Inxight describes it as a chemically modified version of quinupristin.

It is one of the components of the antibiotic combination NXL103.
