= Linopristin/flopristin =

Combination drug

Combination of
- Linopristin: Streptogramin B antibiotic
- Flopristin: Streptogramin A antibiotic

Clinical data
- Other names: NXL103; XRP 2868

Identifiers
- CAS Number: 642080-29-3

Linopristin/flopristin (development codes NXL103 and XRP 2868) is an experimental drug candidate under development by Novexel. It is an oral streptogramin antibiotic that has potent in vitro activity against certain Gram-positive bacteria including methicillin resistant Staphylococcus aureus (MRSA), as well as the important respiratory pathogens including penicillin-, macrolide- and quinolone-resistant strains. It is a combination of linopristin and flopristin.

== Clinical trials ==
Positive results have been reported from a phase II trial comparing it with amoxicillin. Another phase II trial began in 2010 comparing it with linezolid for treatment of acute bacterial skin and skin structure infections (ABSSSI). No development activity has been reported since 2015.
