= RPR =

RPR may refer to:

== Computing ==
- RPR FOM, a distributed computer simulation standard

== Science ==
- RPR problem diagnosis, to find the cause of IT problems
- RPRD2 gene, which encodes the KIAA0460 protein
- RprA RNA, a gene
- Flopristin or RPR 132552A, an antibiotic
- Rapid plasma reagin, a screening test for syphilis

== Politics ==
- Rally for the Republic, or Rassemblement pour la République, a defunct French political party
- Republican Party of Russia – People's Freedom Party, or RPR-PARNAS, a Russian political party
- Romanian People's Republic or Republica Populară Romînă, 1947-1965

== Transportation ==
- Swami Vivekananda Airport, India, IATA code
- Redlands Passenger Rail, previous name of Arrow, California, United States

== Other ==
- Registered Professional Reporter, a US certification
- Resilient Packet Ring or IEEE 802.17, a data traffic protocol
- Ruger Precision Rifle, an American bolt-action rifle
