= Mikamycin =

Mikamycins are a group of macrolide antibiotics.
Mikamycin can refer to:

- Mikamycin A
- Mikamycin B
