= ErmC 23S rRNA methyltransferase =

ErmC 23S rRNA methyltransferase may refer to:

- 23S rRNA (adenine2085-N6)-dimethyltransferase, an enzyme
- rRNA (adenine-N6-)-methyltransferase, an enzyme
