= Pristinamycin =

Group of chemical compounds

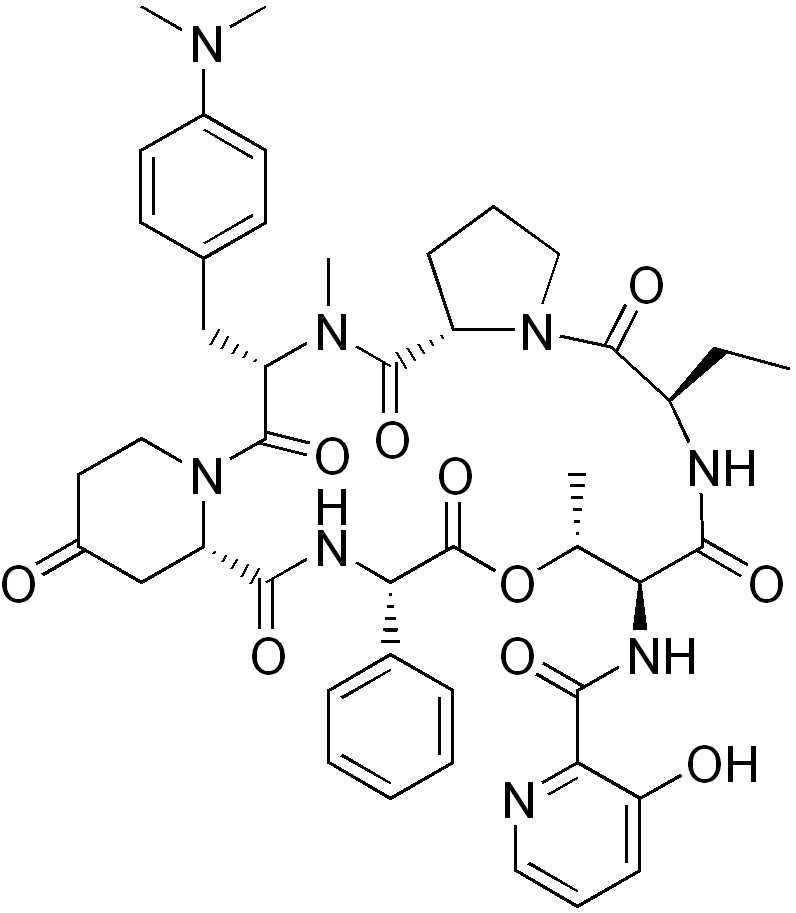

Combination of
- Pristinamycin IA: Streptogramin B antibiotic
- Pristinamycin IIA: Streptogramin A antibiotic

Clinical data
- AHFS/Drugs.com: International Drug Names
- MedlinePlus: a603007
- ATC code: J01FG01 (WHO)

Identifiers
- CAS Number: 270076-60-3
- PubChem CID: 11979535
- ChemSpider: 10152812
- UNII: 4O8O7Q7IU4
- ChEMBL: ChEMBL1256399

Pristinamycin (INN), also spelled pristinamycine, is an antibiotic used primarily in the treatment of staphylococcal infections, and to a lesser extent streptococcal infections. It is a streptogramin group antibiotic, similar to virginiamycin, derived from the bacterium Streptomyces pristinaespiralis. It is marketed in Europe by Sanofi-Aventis under the trade name Pyostacine.

Pristinamycin is a mixture of two components that have a synergistic antibacterial action. Pristinamycin IIA is a macrolide, and results in pristinamycin's having a similar spectrum of action to erythromycin. Pristinamycin IA (streptogramin B) is a depsipeptide. PI and PII are coproduced by S. pristinaespiralis in a ratio of 30:70. Each compound binds to the bacterial 50 S ribosomal subunit and inhibits the elongation process of the protein synthesis, thereby exhibiting only a moderate bacteriostatic activity. However, the combination of both substances acts synergistically and leads to a potent bactericidal activity that can reach up to 100 times that of the separate components.

The pristinamycin biosynthetic gene cluster is the largest antibiotic supercluster known so far, with a size of ~210 kb, wherein the PI and PII biosynthetic genes are not clustered individually but are scattered across the complete sequence region. Furthermore, this biosynthetic gene region is interrupted by a cryptic type II PKS gene cluster.

== Medical use ==
Despite the macrolide component, it is effective against erythromycin-resistant staphylococci and streptococci. It is active against methicillin-resistant Staphylococcus aureus (MRSA). Its usefulness for severe infections, however, may be limited by the lack of an intravenous formulation owing to its poor solubility. Nevertheless, it is sometimes used as an alternative to rifampicin+fusidic acid or linezolid for the treatment of MRSA.

The lack of an intravenous formulation led to the development of the pristinamycin-derivative quinupristin/dalfopristin (i.e., Synercid), which may be administered intravenously for more severe MRSA infections.

== See also ==
- Methicillin-resistant Staphylococcus aureus (MRSA)
- Quinupristin/dalfopristin
