= 23S rRNA (adenine2085-N6)-dimethyltransferase =

Class of enzymes

23S rRNA (adenine^{2085}-N^{6})-dimethyltransferase

Identifiers
- EC no.: 2.1.1.184

Databases
- IntEnz: IntEnz view
- BRENDA: BRENDA entry
- ExPASy: NiceZyme view
- KEGG: KEGG entry
- MetaCyc: metabolic pathway
- PRIAM: profile
- PDB structures: RCSB PDB PDBe PDBsum
Search
- PMC: articles
- PubMed: articles
- NCBI: proteins

23S rRNA (adenine^{2085}-N^{6})-dimethyltransferase (EC 2.1.1.184, ErmC' methyltransferase, ermC methylase, ermC 23S rRNA methyltransferase, rRNA:m^{6}A methyltransferase ErmC', ErmC', rRNA methyltransferase ErmC' ) is an enzyme with systematic name S-adenosyl-L-methionine:23S rRNA (adenine^{2085}-N^{6})-dimethyltransferase. This enzyme catalyses the following chemical reaction

2 S-adenosyl-L-methionine + adenine^{2085} in 23S rRNA $\rightleftharpoons$ 2 S-adenosyl-L-homocysteine + N^{6}-dimethyladenine^{2085} in 23S rRNA

ErmC is a methyltransferase that confers resistance to the macrolide-lincosamide-streptogramin B group of antibiotics by catalysing the methylation of 23S rRNA at adenine^{2085}.
