= Spiruchostatin =

Spiruchostatin A

Names
- Preferred IUPAC name (1S,4R,8S,12S,13R,21E)-12-Hydroxy-4-methyl-13-(propan-2-yl)-9-oxa-17,18-dithia-2,5,14-triazabicyclo[7.7.6]docos-21-ene-3,6,10,15-tetrone

Identifiers
CAS Number	A: 328548-11-4
3D model (JSmol)	A: Interactive image; B: Interactive image
ChemSpider	A: 52083527; B: 65322312
PubChem CID	A: 60209141
UNII	A: 30Q3VS5HZ4
- InChI: A: InChI=1S/C20H31N3O6S2/c1-11(2)18-15(24)9-17(26)29-13-6-4-5-7-30-31-10-14(20(28)23-18)22-19(27)12(3)21-16(25)8-13/h4,6,11-15,18,24H,5,7-10H2,1-3H3,(H,21,25)(H,22,27)(H,23,28)/b6-4-/t12-,13-,14-,15+,18-/m1/s1 Key: XFLBOEMFLGLWFF-KXTRVMKXSA-N; B: InChI=1S/C21H33N3O6S2/c1-4-12(2)19-16(25)10-18(27)30-14-7-5-6-8-31-32-11-15(21(29)24-19)23-20(28)13(3)22-17(26)9-14/h5,7,12-16,19,25H,4,6,8-11H2,1-3H3,(H,22,26)(H,23,28)(H,24,29)/b7-5+/t12-,13+,14?,15+,16-,19+/m0/s1 Key: MJHZJODQLYCXHE-YJDTZIEMSA-N
- SMILES: A: CC(C)[C@H]1NC(=O)[C@H]2CSSCC\C=C\[C@H](CC(=O)N[C@H](C)C(=O)N2)OC(=O)C[C@@H]1O; B: CC[C@H](C)[C@H]1/N=C(/O)[C@H]2CSSCC/C=C/C(C/C(O)=N/[C@H](C)/C(O)=N/2)OC(=O)C[C@@H]1O

Properties
Chemical formula	C_{20}H_{31}N_{3}O_{6}S_{2}
Molar mass	473.60 g·mol^{−1}
- Except where otherwise noted, data are given for materials in their standard state (at 25 °C [77 °F], 100 kPa). verify (what is ?) Infobox references

Spiruchostatins are a group of chemical compounds isolated from Pseudomonas sp. as gene expression-enhancing substances. They possess novel bicyclic depsipeptides involving 4-amino-3-hydroxy-5-methylhexanoic acid and 4-amino-3-hydroxy-5-methylheptanoic acid residues. The two main forms are spiruchostatin A and spiruchostatin B.

== Uses ==
Spiruchostatin A is a natural product that is showing positive signs of development as a prodrug. Very often, prodrugs are made by simple addition of groups, such as acetyl or alkyl chains, to the drug through amide or ester formation. Similarly, in nature there are examples in which protecting groups are added to an NP, as a strategy for self resistance. This evolutionary trait allows the organism to carry the toxic compound harmlessly until the target is presented that activates the NP.

Spiruchostatin A is a member of a class of cyclic, cysteine-containing, depsipeptidic natural products. Due to their histone deacetylase (HDAC) inhibitory activity, tremendous effort has been thrust into the synthesis of these compounds and their analogs as potential chemotherapeutic targets. In human cancers, HDACs are often over-expressed and are recruited to reduce the transcription of tumor suppressor genes and other cell growth regulators. HDAC inhibitors are therefore thought to increase the expression of tumor suppressor genes, and they are an emerging compound class in the treatment of cancers, with several agents either approved or in development.
