= Thiocoraline =

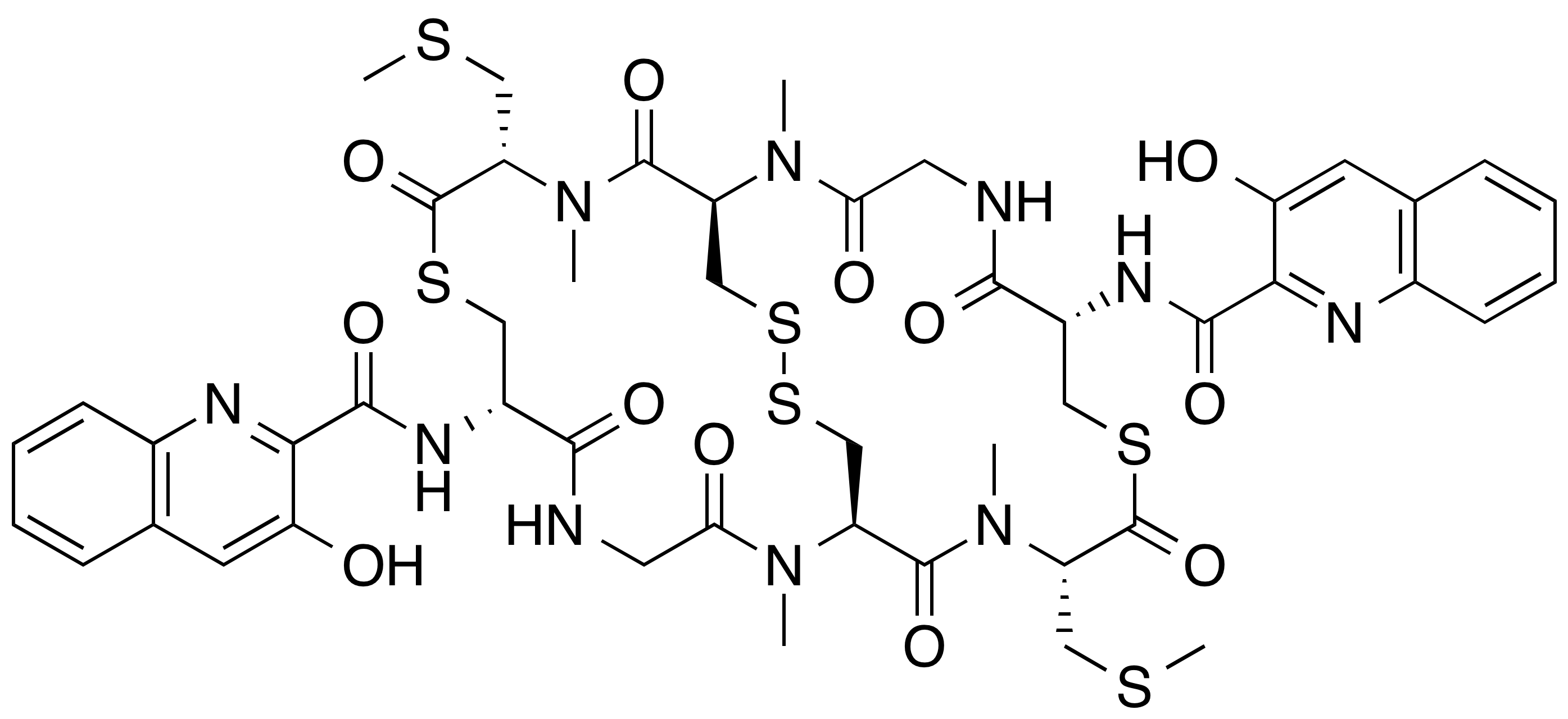

Names
- IUPAC name N,N′-{(1R,7S,11S,14R,20S,24S)-2,12,15,25-Tetramethyl-11,24-bis[(methylsulfanyl)methyl]-3,6,10,13,16,19,23,26-octaoxo-9,22,28,29-tetrathia-2,5,12,15,18,25-hexaazabicyclo[12.12.4]triacontane-7,20-diyl}bis(3-hydroxy-2-quinolinecarboxamide)
- Other names Thiocoraline A

Identifiers
CAS Number	173046-02-1
3D model (JSmol)	Interactive image
ChemSpider	8030716
PubChem CID	485475
CompTox Dashboard (EPA)	DTXSID50333133
- InChI: InChI=1S/C48H56N10O12S6/c1-55-31-23-75-76-24-32(46(68)58(4)34(22-72-6)48(70)74-19-29(41(63)49-17-37(55)61)53-43(65)39-35(59)15-25-11-7-9-13-27(25)51-39)56(2)38(62)18-50-42(64)30(20-73-47(69)33(21-71-5)57(3)45(31)67)54-44(66)40-36(60)16-26-12-8-10-14-28(26)52-40/h7-16,29-34,59-60H,17-24H2,1-6H3,(H,49,63)(H,50,64)(H,53,65)(H,54,66)/t29-,30-,31+,32+,33+,34+/m1/s1 Key: UPGGKUQISSWRJJ-ZRBWWFCKSA-N
- SMILES: CN1[C@H]2CSSC[C@@H](C(=O)N([C@H](C(=O)SC[C@H](C(=O)NCC1=O)NC(=O)C3=NC4=CC=CC=C4C=C3O)CSC)C)N(C(=O)CNC(=O)[C@@H](CSC(=O)[C@@H](N(C2=O)C)CSC)NC(=O)C5=NC6=CC=CC=C6C=C5O)C

Properties
Chemical formula	C_{48}H_{56}N_{10}O_{12}S_{6}
Molar mass	1157.39 g·mol^{−1}
- Except where otherwise noted, data are given for materials in their standard state (at 25 °C [77 °F], 100 kPa). Infobox references

Thiocoraline is a microbial natural product of the depsipeptide class. Thiocoraline was isolated from the mycelium cake of a marine actinomycete strain L-13-ACM2-092. In vitro, thiocoraline causes an arrest in G1 phase of the cell cycle and decreases the rate of S phase progression towards G2/M phase. Thiocoraline is likely to be a DNA replication inhibitor. Thiocoraline is produced on a nonribosomal peptide synthetase (NRPS) assembly line.
