= Aurantimycin A =

Names
- IUPAC name (2R)-N-[(6S,9R,16S,17S,20R,23S)-7,21-dihydroxy-6-(methoxymethyl)-20-methyl-2,5,8,15,19,22-hexaoxo-17-propan-2-yl-18-oxa-1,4,7,13,14,21,27-heptazatricyclo[21.4.0.09,14]heptacosan-16-yl]-2-hydroxy-2-[(2S,5S,6S)-2-hydroxy-6-methyl-5-(2-methylpropyl)oxan-2-yl]propanamide
- Other names Aurantimycin

Identifiers
| CAS Number | 162478-50-4 |
| 3D model (JSmol) | Interactive image |
| ChEMBL | ChEMBL1241097 |
| ChemSpider | 8277625 |
| PubChem CID | 10102093 |
- InChI: InChI=1S/C38H64N8O14/c1-20(2)17-24-13-14-38(55,60-23(24)6)37(7,54)36(53)42-29-30(21(3)4)59-35(52)22(5)45(56)32(49)25-11-9-15-40-43(25)28(47)18-39-31(48)27(19-58-8)46(57)33(50)26-12-10-16-41-44(26)34(29)51/h20-27,29-30,40-41,54-57H,9-19H2,1-8H3,(H,39,48)(H,42,53)/t22-,23+,24+,25+,26-,27+,29+,30+,37+,38+/m1/s1 Key: JSVPJXYQXDNLRD-NSCUIBACSA-N
- SMILES: C[C@H]1[C@@H](CC[C@](O1)([C@](C)(C(=O)N[C@H]2[C@@H](OC(=O)[C@H](N(C(=O)[C@@H]3CCCNN3C(=O)CNC(=O)[C@@H](N(C(=O)[C@H]4CCCNN4C2=O)O)COC)O)C)C(C)C)O)O)CC(C)C

Properties
| Chemical formula | C_{38}H_{64}N_{8}O_{14} |
| Molar mass | 856.972 g·mol^{−1} |
- Except where otherwise noted, data are given for materials in their standard state (at 25 °C [77 °F], 100 kPa). Infobox references

Aurantimycin A is a depsipeptide antibiotic with the molecular formula C_{38}H_{64}N_{8}O_{14}. Aurantimycin A is produced by the bacterium Streptomyces aurantiacus. Aurantimycin A shows cytotoxic properties.
