= Flopristin =

Names
- IUPAC name (7R,10R,11R,12Z,17Z,19Z,21S,23R)-23-fluoro-21-hydroxy-11,19-dimethyl-10-propan-2-yl-9,26-dioxa-3,15,28-triazatricyclo[23.2.1.03,7]octacosa-1(27),12,17,19,25(28)-pentaene-2,8,14-trione
- Other names (16R)-16-Desoxy-16-fluoropristinamycin IIB; RPR 132552; RPR 132552A

Identifiers
| CAS Number | 318498-76-9 |
| 3D model (JSmol) | Interactive image |
| ChemSpider | 8090642 |
| ECHA InfoCard | 100.218.104 |
| EC Number | 690-752-1 |
| PubChem CID | 21944122 |
| UNII | OZV2QPB39M |
| CompTox Dashboard (EPA) | DTXSID40953763 |
- InChI: InChI=1S/C28H38FN3O6/c1-17(2)26-19(4)9-10-24(34)30-11-5-7-18(3)13-21(33)14-20(29)15-25-31-22(16-37-25)27(35)32-12-6-8-23(32)28(36)38-26/h5,7,9-10,13,16-17,19-21,23,26,33H,6,8,11-12,14-15H2,1-4H3,(H,30,34)/b7-5-,10-9-,18-13-/t19-,20-,21-,23-,26-/m1/s1 Key: DFSJQGCLWZVMOD-ZITBLJMASA-N
- SMILES: O[C@H](/C=C(C)/C=C/CNC(/C=C/[C@@H](C)[C@H](OC1=O)C(C)C)=O)C[C@@H](F)CC2=NC(C(N3[C@@H]1CCC3)=O)=CO2

Properties
| Chemical formula | C_{28}H_{38}FN_{3}O_{6} |
| Molar mass | 531.625 g·mol^{−1} |

Hazards
- GHS labelling
| Pictograms | (GHS07: Exclamation mark) (GHS08: Health hazard) |
| Signal word | Warning |
| Hazard statements | H302, H312, H317, H332, H341 |
| Precautionary statements | P201, P202, P261, P264, P270, P271, P272, P280, P281, P301+P312, P302+P352, P304+P312, P304+P340, P308+P313, P312, P321, P322, P330, P333+P313, P363, P405, P501 |
- Except where otherwise noted, data are given for materials in their standard state (at 25 °C [77 °F], 100 kPa). Infobox references

Flopristin is a semi-synthetic antibiotic of the streptogramin A class. It is a fluorinated derivative of pristinamycin IIB.

Flopristin is one of the components of the experimental drug NXL103.
