= Coibamide A =

Names
- IUPAC name [(2S)-1-[[(2S)-1-[[(2S)-1-[[(3S,6S,9S,12S,15S,18S,21S,22R)-15-[(2S)-butan-2-yl]-18-(methoxymethyl)-6-[(4-methoxyphenyl)methyl]-3,4,10,12,16,19,22-heptamethyl-9-(2-methylpropyl)-2,5,8,11,14,17,20-heptaoxo-1-oxa-4,7,10,13,16,19-hexazacyclodocos-21-yl]-methylamino]-4-methyl-1-oxopentan-2-yl]-methylamino]-3-methoxy-1-oxopropan-2-yl]-methylamino]-3-methyl-1-oxobutan-2-yl] (2S)-2-(dimethylamino)-3-methylbutanoate

Identifiers
CAS Number	1029227-48-2
3D model (JSmol)	Interactive image
ChemSpider	27023755
PubChem CID	24881184
CompTox Dashboard (EPA)	DTXSID601018181
- InChI: InChI=1S/C65H110N10O16/c1-26-40(10)52-56(77)66-41(11)57(78)70(17)47(31-36(2)3)55(76)67-46(33-44-27-29-45(89-25)30-28-44)58(79)69(16)42(12)64(85)90-43(13)53(62(83)72(19)50(35-88-24)61(82)74(52)21)75(22)59(80)48(32-37(4)5)71(18)60(81)49(34-87-23)73(20)63(84)54(39(8)9)91-65(86)51(38(6)7)68(14)15/h27-30,36-43,46-54H,26,31-35H2,1-25H3,(H,66,77)(H,67,76)/t40-,41-,42-,43+,46-,47-,48-,49-,50-,51-,52-,53-,54-/m0/s1 Key: LVHKHLZPRPTQJG-BNLDXBMISA-N
- SMILES: CC[C@H](C)[C@H]1C(=O)N[C@H](C(=O)N([C@H](C(=O)N[C@H](C(=O)N([C@H](C(=O)O[C@@H]([C@@H](C(=O)N([C@H](C(=O)N1C)COC)C)N(C)C(=O)[C@H](CC(C)C)N(C)C(=O)[C@H](COC)N(C)C(=O)[C@H](C(C)C)OC(=O)[C@H](C(C)C)N(C)C)C)C)C)CC2=CC=C(C=C2)OC)CC(C)C)C)C

Properties
Chemical formula	C_{65}H_{110}N_{10}O_{16}
Molar mass	1287.649 g·mol^{−1}
- Except where otherwise noted, data are given for materials in their standard state (at 25 °C [77 °F], 100 kPa). Infobox references

Coibamide A is an antiproliferative depsipeptide. It comes from the Leptolyngbya cyanobacterium.
