= Streptomyces daghestanicus =

Scientific classification
- Domain: Bacteria
- Kingdom: Bacillati
- Phylum: Actinomycetota
- Class: Actinomycetes
- Order: Streptomycetales
- Family: Streptomycetaceae
- Genus: Streptomyces
- Species: S. daghestanicus

Binomial name
- Streptomyces daghestanicus (Sveshnikova 1957) Pridham et al. 1958 (Approved Lists 1980)

Type strain
- AS 4.169, ATCC 19747, ATCC 23620, BCRC 11468, CBS 486.68, CCRC 11468, CGMCC 4.1690, DSM 40149, IFO 12762, INA 13897/54, INA 2655/55, INA 2656/55, INMI 2656/55, ISP 5149, JCM 4365, KCC S-0365, NBRC 12762, NRRL B-5418, NRRL-ISP 5149, RIA 1028, UNIQEM 134, VKM Ac-1722, VKM Ac-1862

Synonyms
- "Actinomyces daghestanicus" Sveshnikova 1957

Species of bacterium

Streptomyces daghestanicus is a bacterium species from the genus of Streptomyces which has been isolated from soil in Daghestan in Russia. Streptomyces daghestanicus produces etamycin.

== See also ==
- List of Streptomyces species
