= Streptogramin =

Class of antibiotics

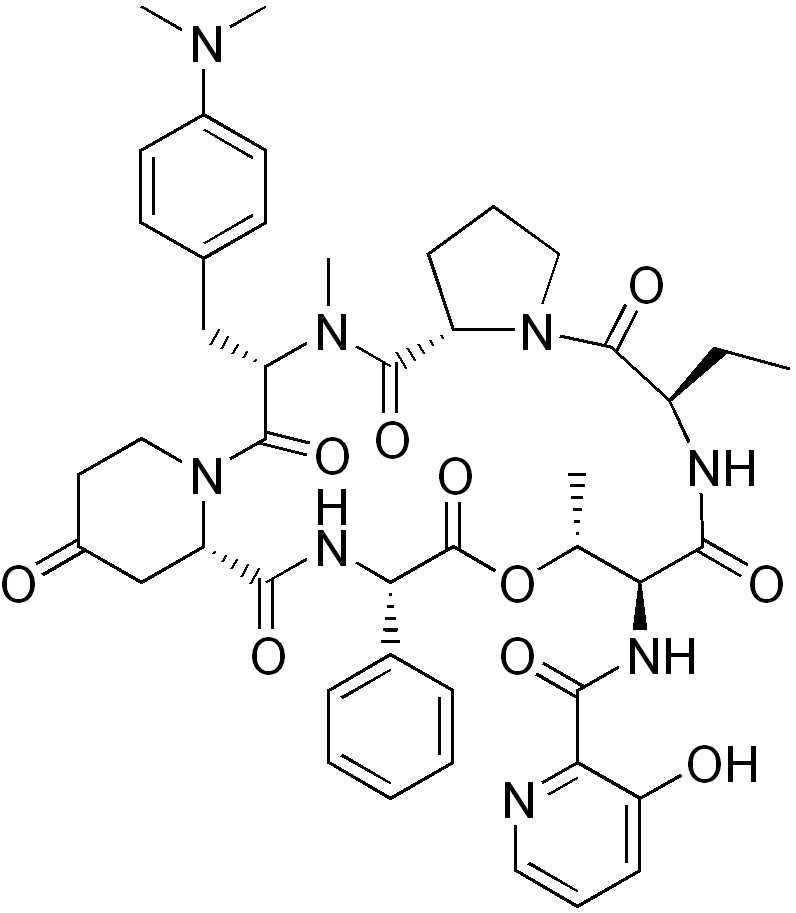
Pristinamycin IA, a natural member of the streptogramin B class

Pristinamycin IIA, a natural member of the streptogramin A class

Streptogramins are a class of antibiotics. They work as protein synthesis inhibitors.

Streptogramins are effective in the treatment of vancomycin-resistant Staphylococcus aureus (VRSA) and vancomycin-resistant Enterococcus (VRE), two of the most rapidly growing strains of multidrug-resistant bacteria. They fall into two groups: streptogramin A (23-membered macrolide) and streptogramin B (depsipeptide). The two groups act synergistically. They are naturally produced in a 3:7 ratio; most formulations keep this ratio.

Members include:

- Quinupristin/dalfopristin, made by chemically modifying pristinamycin (semisynthesis)
- Pristinamycin, made by Streptomyces pristinaespiralis
- Virginiamycin, made by Streptomyces virginiae and others
- Linopristin/flopristin, made by semisynthesis. experimental streptogramin in clinical trials for the treatment of respiratory tract infections.
- Etamycin, a streptogramin B.
