= Streptomyces hawaiiensis =

Scientific classification
- Domain: Bacteria
- Kingdom: Bacillati
- Phylum: Actinomycetota
- Class: Actinomycetes
- Order: Streptomycetales
- Family: Streptomycetaceae
- Genus: Streptomyces
- Species: S. hawaiiensis

Binomial name
- Streptomyces hawaiiensis Cron et al. 1956

Type strain
- 678506 (A8506), ATCC 12236, ATCC 19771, BCRC 13653, BL678506(A8506), Bristol labs 678506, CBS 164.64, CBS 16464, CBS 509.68, CCRC 13653, DSM 40042, ETH 28533, IFM 1071, IFO 12784, IMET 43082, ISP 5042, JCM 4172, JCM 4585, KCC S-0172, KCC S-0585, KCCS-0172, KCCS-0585, LMG 5975, NBRC 12784, NCIB 9410, NCIM 2627, NCIMB 9410, NRRL B-1988, NRRL-ISP 5042, PCM 2315, PSA 98, RIA 1051, UNIQEM 157, VKM Ac-1761

Species of bacterium

Streptomyces hawaiiensis is a bacterium species from the genus of Streptomyces which has been isolated from soil in Hawaii in the United States. Streptomyces hawaiiensis produces bryamycin and acyldepsipeptides.

== See also ==
- List of Streptomyces species
