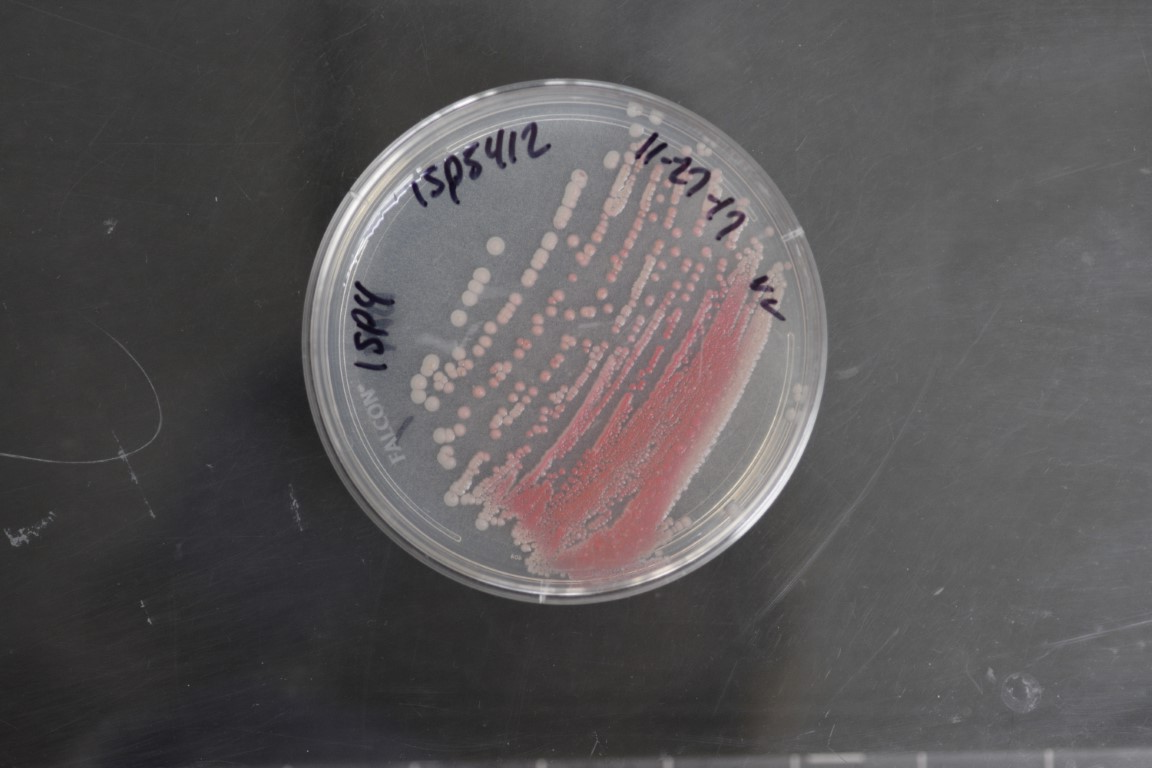

Scientific classification
- Domain: Bacteria
- Kingdom: Bacillati
- Phylum: Actinomycetota
- Class: Actinomycetia
- Order: Streptomycetales
- Family: Streptomycetaceae
- Genus: Streptomyces
- Species: S. aurantiacus

Binomial name
- Streptomyces aurantiacus (Rossi Doria 1891) Waksman 1953 (Approved Lists 1980)

Type strain
- AS 4.1429, ATCC 19822, ATCC 25429, BCRC 16233, CBS 927.69, CCRC 16233, CGMCC 4.1429, DSM 40412, IFO 13017, INMI 1373, ISP 54112, ISP 5412, JCM 4453, KCC S-0453, LMG 19358, NBRC 13017, NRRL ISP-5412, NRRL-ISP 5412, R-8723, RIA 1209, VKM Ac-44

Synonyms
- "Actinomyces albosporeus" Krainsky 1914; "Actinomyces aurantiacus" (Rossi Doria 1891) Gasperini 1894; "Actinomyces glomeroaurantiacus" Krassilnikov and Yuan 1965; "Cladothrix aurantiaca" (Rossi Doria 1891) Mace 1897; "Nocardia aurantiaca" (Rossi Doria 1891) Chalmers and Christopherson 1916; "Streptotrix aurantiaca" Rossi Doria 1891; Streptomyces albosporeus subsp. albosporeus (Krainsky 1914) Waksman and Henrici 1948; Streptomyces albosporeus (Krainsky 1914) Waksman and Henrici 1948 (Approved Lists 1980); Streptomyces glomeroaurantiacus (Krassilnikov and Yuan 1965) Pridham 1970 (Approved Lists 1980)

= Streptomyces aurantiacus =

Species of bacterium

Streptomyces aurantiacus is a bacterium species from the genus Streptomyces which produces aurantin, pamamycin-621, aurantimycin A, aurantimycin B, aurantimycin C, aurantimycin D, dihydronancimycin and ancimycin.

== See also ==
- List of Streptomyces species
