= Virginiamycin S1 =

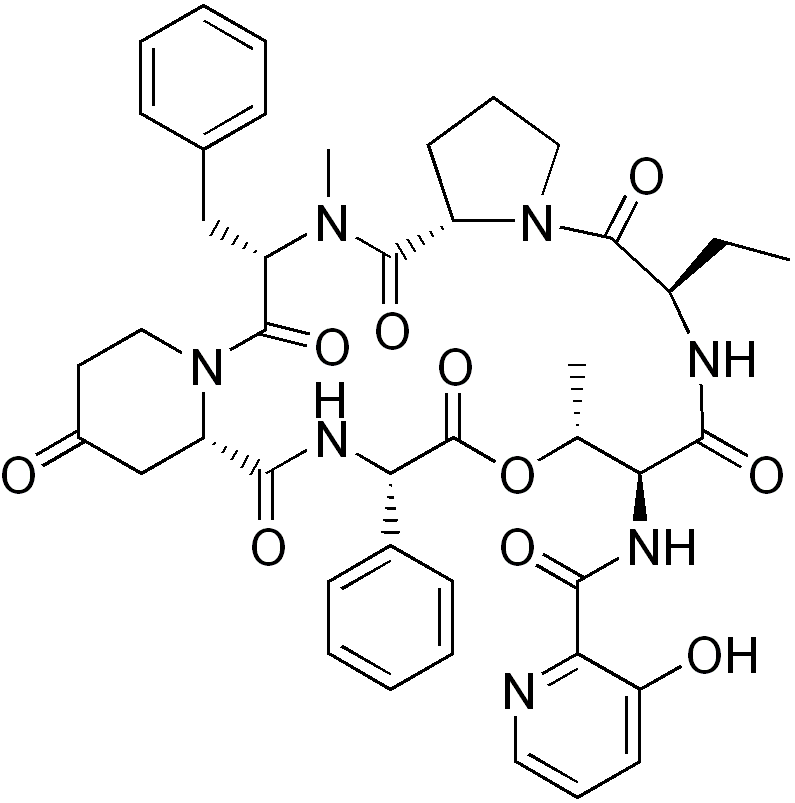

Names
- Systematic IUPAC name N-[(6R,9S,10R,13S,15aS,22S,24aS)-22-Benzyl-6-ethyl-10,23-dimethyl-5,8,12,15,17,21,24-heptaoxo-13-phenyldocosahydro-12H-pyrido[2,1-f]pyrrolo[2,1-l][1,4,7,10,13,16]oxapentaazacyclononadecin-9-yl]-3-hydroxypyridine-2-carboxamide

Identifiers
CAS Number	23152-29-6
3D model (JSmol)	Interactive image
ChEBI	CHEBI:46416
ChemSpider	4534976
ECHA InfoCard	100.041.314
PubChem CID	5388936
UNII	J91D5GN5AT
CompTox Dashboard (EPA)	DTXSID0046856
- InChI: InChI=1S/C43H49N7O10/c1-4-29-40(56)49-21-12-17-30(49)41(57)48(3)32(23-26-13-7-5-8-14-26)42(58)50-22-19-28(51)24-31(50)37(53)47-35(27-15-9-6-10-16-27)43(59)60-25(2)34(38(54)45-29)46-39(55)36-33(52)18-11-20-44-36/h5-11,13-16,18,20,25,29-32,34-35,52H,4,12,17,19,21-24H2,1-3H3,(H,45,54)(H,46,55)(H,47,53)/t25-,29-,30+,31+,32+,34+,35+/m1/s1 Key: FEPMHVLSLDOMQC-IYPFLVAKSA-N; InChI=1/C43H49N7O10/c1-4-29-40(56)49-21-12-17-30(49)41(57)48(3)32(23-26-13-7-5-8-14-26)42(58)50-22-19-28(51)24-31(50)37(53)47-35(27-15-9-6-10-16-27)43(59)60-25(2)34(38(54)45-29)46-39(55)36-33(52)18-11-20-44-36/h5-11,13-16,18,20,25,29-32,34-35,52H,4,12,17,19,21-24H2,1-3H3,(H,45,54)(H,46,55)(H,47,53)/t25-,29-,30+,31+,32+,34+,35+/m1/s1 Key: FEPMHVLSLDOMQC-IYPFLVAKBH
- SMILES: O=C([C@H](CC2=CC=CC=C2)N(C)[C@]([C@H]6N(CCC6)C5=O)=O)N1[C@H]([C@](N[C@H](C(O[C@H](C)[C@@H](C(N[C@@H]5CC)=O)NC(C4=NC=CC=C4O)=O)=O)[C@]3=CC=CC=C3)=O)CC(CC1)=O

Properties
Chemical formula	C_{43}H_{49}N_{7}O_{10}
Molar mass	823.904 g·mol^{−1}
- Except where otherwise noted, data are given for materials in their standard state (at 25 °C [77 °F], 100 kPa). verify (what is ?) Infobox references

Virginiamycin S1 is a macrolide antibiotic in the group of antibiotics known as streptogramin B.
