= Protein synthesis inhibitor =

Inhibitors of translation

Simplified schematic of mRNA translation

A protein synthesis inhibitor is a compound that stops or slows the growth or proliferation of cells by disrupting the processes that lead directly to the generation of new proteins.

A ribosome is a biological machine that utilizes protein dynamics on nanoscales to translate RNA into proteins. The rotating action of the small subunit, responsible for translocation is not shown.

While a broad interpretation of this definition could be used to describe nearly any compound depending on concentration, in practice, it usually refers to compounds that act at the molecular level on translational machinery (either the ribosome itself or the translation factor), taking advantages of the major differences between prokaryotic and eukaryotic ribosome structures.

== Mechanism ==
In general, protein synthesis inhibitors work at different stages of bacterial mRNA translation into proteins, like initiation, elongation (including aminoacyl tRNA entry, proofreading, peptidyl transfer, and bacterial translocation) and termination:

=== Earlier stages ===
- Rifamycin inhibits bacterial DNA transcription into mRNA by inhibiting DNA-dependent RNA polymerase by binding its beta-subunit.
- alpha-Amanitin is a powerful inhibitor of eukaryotic DNA transcription machinery.

=== Initiation ===
- Linezolid acts at the initiation stage, probably by preventing the formation of the initiation complex, although the mechanism is not fully understood.

=== Ribosome assembly ===
- Aminoglycosides prevent ribosome assembly by binding to the bacterial 30S ribosomal subunit.

=== Aminoacyl tRNA entry ===
- Tetracyclines and Tigecycline (a glycylcycline related to tetracyclines) block the A site on the ribosome, preventing the binding of aminoacyl tRNAs.

=== Proofreading ===
- Aminoglycosides, among other potential mechanisms of action, interfere with the proofreading process, causing increased rate of error in synthesis with premature termination.

=== Peptidyl transfer ===
- Chloramphenicol blocks the peptidyl transfer step of elongation on the 50S ribosomal subunit in both bacteria and mitochondria.
- Macrolides (as well as inhibiting ribosomal translocation and other potential mechanisms) bind to the 50s ribosomal subunits, inhibiting peptidyl transfer.
- Streptogramins such as Quinupristin/dalfopristin act synergistically, with dalfopristin, enhancing the binding of quinupristin, as well as inhibiting peptidyl transfer. Quinupristin binds to a nearby site on the 50S ribosomal subunit and prevents elongation of the polypeptide, as well as causing incomplete chains to be released.
- Geneticin, also called G418, inhibits the elongation step in both prokaryotic and eukaryotic ribosomes.
- Trichothecene mycotoxins are potent and non selective inhibitors of peptide elongation.

=== Ribosomal translocation ===
- Macrolides, clindamycin and aminoglycosides (with all these three having other potential mechanisms of action as well), have evidence of inhibition of ribosomal translocation.
- Fusidic acid prevents the turnover of elongation factor G (EF-G) from the ribosome.
- Ricin inhibits elongation by enzymatically modifying an rRNA of the eukaryotic 60S ribosomal subunit.

=== Termination ===
- Macrolides and clindamycin (both also having other potential mechanisms) cause premature dissociation of the peptidyl-tRNA from the ribosome.
- Puromycin has a structure similar to that of the tyrosinyl aminoacyl-tRNA. Thus, it binds to the ribosomal A site and participates in peptide bond formation, producing peptidyl-puromycin. However, it does not engage in translocation and quickly dissociates from the ribosome, causing a premature termination of polypeptide synthesis.
- Streptogramins also cause premature release of the peptide chain.

=== Protein synthesis inhibitors of unspecified mechanism ===
- Retapamulin
- Mupirocin
- Fusidic acid

== Binding site ==
The following antibiotics bind to the 30S subunit of the ribosome:

- Aminoglycosides
- Tetracyclines

The following antibiotics bind to the 50S ribosomal subunit:

- Chloramphenicol
- Clindamycin
- Linezolid (an oxazolidinone)
- Macrolides
- Telithromycin
- Streptogramins
- Retapamulin

== See also ==
- Protein biosynthesis
- Bacterial translation
- Eukaryotic translation
- Archaeal translation
