= Acyldepsipeptide antibiotics =

Class of chemical compounds

Acyldepsipeptide or cyclic acyldepsipeptide (ADEP) is a class of potential antibiotics first isolated from bacteria and act by deregulating the ClpP protease. Natural ADEPs were originally found as products of aerobic fermentation in Streptomyces hawaiiensis, A54556A and B, and in the culture broth of Streptomyces species, enopeptin A and B. ADEPs are of great interest in drug development due to their antibiotic properties and thus are being modified in attempt to achieve greater antimicrobial activity.

The potential role of ADEPs in combating antibiotic drug resistance is postulated due to their novel mode of action that other antibiotics are not known to use, activation of casein lytic protease (ClpP) which is an important bacterial protease. Most antibiotics work through inhibitory processes to establish cell death, while ADEPs actually work through activation of the protease to cause uncontrolled protein degradation, inhibition of cell division, and subsequent cell death. They largely affect Gram-positive bacteria and could be of great use to target antibiotic resistant microbes such as methicillin-resistant Staphylococcus aureus (MRSA), penicillin-resistant Streptococcus pneumoniae (PRSP), Mycobacterium tuberculosis, and others. Despite the potential use of ADEP, possible resistance has been examined in certain species.

Chemical structures of natural ADEPs
Enopeptin A

Enopeptin B

A54556A

A54556B

== Mechanism ==
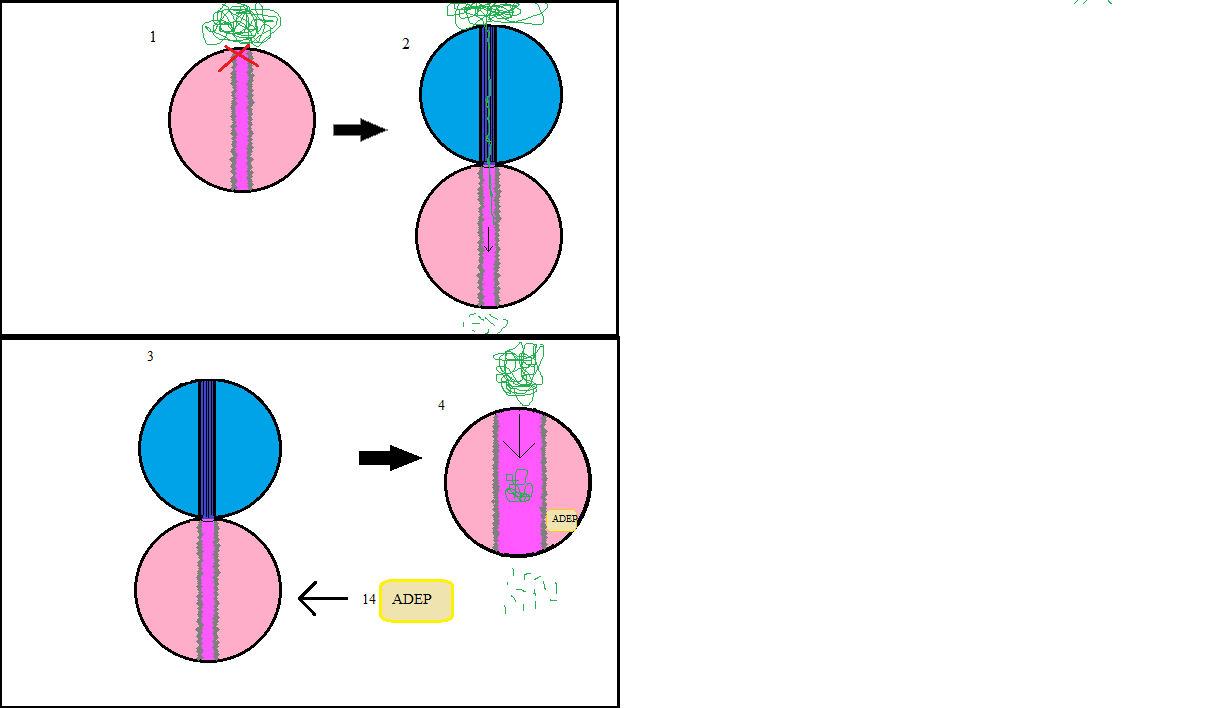
1. ClpP cannot degrade protein chains longer than 5 peptides because they are bigger than its proteolytic channel. 2. ClpP requires an ATPase to unfold big proteins, allowing them to pass through ClpP's channel. 3. When ADEPs bind to ClpP, the ATPase/ClpP complex dissociate. 4. The proteolytic channel of ClpP becomes large enough to degrade the proteins without the help of any ATPase.

ADEP antibiotics can be used to defeat resistant bacterial infections. They bind to ClpP and allow the protease to degrade proteins without the help of an ATPase. ADEP4/ClpP complexes target primarily newly formed proteins, and FtsZ which allows cell division. ClpP active form is a tetradecamer composed of two heptamers to which 14 ADEPs bind to.

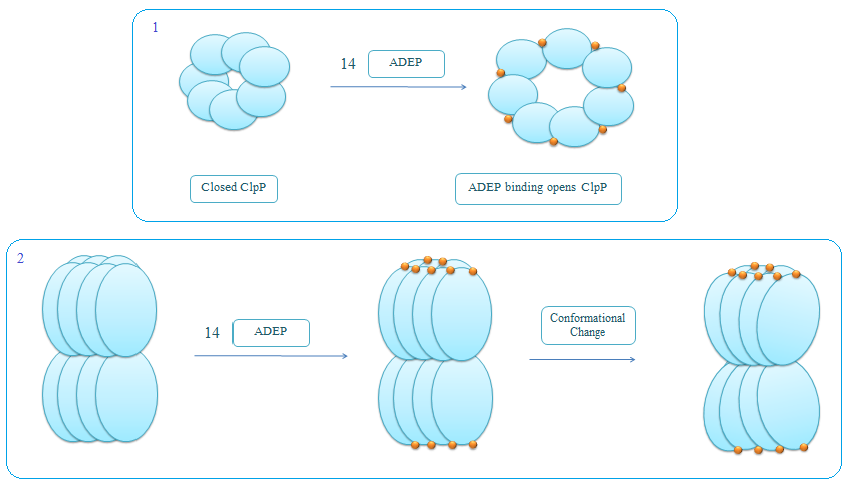
14 ADEPs bind to ClpP leading to changes in its structure. ClpP's proteolytic channel goes from a closed to an open and unregulated state. 1.Top View 2. Side View

ADEPs bind in the cavities formed by two ClpP monomers. Their binding site is composed of hydrophobic residues and corresponds to the binding sites of ClpP ATPases. Upon binding, a series of secondary structures shifts occur from the outer region to the center of ClpP. This puts the flexible N-terminal β-loop, into a disordered state. The β-loops normally form a gate above the proteolytic channel and prevent proteins from randomly passing through. They are critical for ClpP interaction with its substrate and ATPases. When ADEP binds, the β-loops shift outward and this is accompanied by the shifts of two α-helices (α1 and α2), four β-strands (β1, β2, β3 and β5) and other loops which lead to the opening of the ClpP pore. In summary, ADEP4 deregulates ClpP function and changes it from a closed state to an open one. At this point its specific proteolytic activity becomes a less controlled process, with the destruction of proteins that are around in the targeted cell.

The peptidase ClpP is highly conserved throughout organisms and is tightly regulated. Without activation, ClpP in normal conditions can degrade short peptides that freely diffuse into its inner degradation chamber. Clp-family proteins are ATP-dependent proteases which play a crucial role in the cell function by degrading misfolded proteins. ClpP is a monomer on its own but oligomerizes into tetradecamers when bound to ATPases. It needs an ATPase to identify, unfold, and transfer targeted big proteins into its proteolytic channel. In fact, ClpP on its own can only degrade peptides that are up to six amino acids long. ADEP binding induces ClpP proteolytic activation that leads to the proteins degradation in the cell, especially nascent proteins and the Ftsz protein which is an important protein in cell division. This potentially leads to cell death and is the reason why ADEP is a promising technique for drug development.

For folded proteins, unfolded proteins, and long peptides, ClpP must be activated by a protein in the family of ATPase associated with diverse cellular activities (AAA proteins), such as ClpA, ClpX, or ClpC. These chaperone proteins are responsible for hydrolyzing ATP to ADP, harnessing the energy, and then taking folded proteins and unfolding them. Next, Clp-ATPases slip the unfolded proteins into the degradation chamber within ClpP, allowing for processive degradation of the substrate. This process is tightly regulated with the hydrolysis of ATP to prevent uncontrolled protein or peptide degradation that would be harmful to the cell.

In contrast, ADEP activates ClpP without the need for ATP hydrolysis, causing degradation of unfolded proteins and peptides within the cell at uncontrolled rates. ADEPs are thought to bind slightly cooperatively on the surface of each ClpP ring in its hydrophobic pockets and have allosteric effects in activation of ClpP. This binding initiates ClpP to undergo a conformational change such that its N-terminal region opens up its axial pore to allow for partial degradation of products, as compared to progressive degradation with ClpA. ADEP activation of ClpP does not allow for folded protein degradation, but even with unfolded protein and peptide degradation, ADEP still causes bacterial cell death.

Research has shown that ADEP-activated ClpP targets cell division rather than metabolic processes. ADEP appears to initiate ClpP to preferably degrade FtsZ, an important bacterial protein involved in septum formation that is necessary for bacterial cell division. As a result, Gram-positive bacteria treated with ADEPs form long filaments before cell death.

== Advantages ==
When bacteria are exposed to antibiotics they can become resistant or tolerant to the antibiotic. ADEPs have a great potential for clinical application due to their high antibacterial activity against Gram-positive pathogens such as Staphylococcus aureus, and other pathogens that are found in biofilms and chronic infections. Their effectiveness increases when combined with different antibiotics such as ciprofloxacin, linezolid, vancomycin or rifampicin. Additional studies should focus more on the toxicity of ADEPs and their implementation for clinical use.

== Applications ==
After the dysregulation of bacterial proteolytic machinery by a new class of antibiotics was published in the Journal Nature, many scientists started to study this antibiotic. Most of the experiments are focused on how the ADEPs/ClpP complex work, and the functional difference between ADEP and its synthetic congeners.

In 2011, P. Sass and co-workers performed a research focusing in the interaction and function of ADEPs and ClpP. They induced ADEP into Bacillus subtilis, Staphylococcus aureus and Streptococcus pneumoniae to identify how ADEP leads to the death of bacteria. The results demonstrated that ADEP is perturbing bacterial cell division. To identify the reason why ADEP inhibited cell division, researchers monitored septum formation and nucleoid segregation in ADEP B. subtilis and ADEP S. aureus. The S. aureus and B. subtilis samples gave equivalent results. This part showed the importance of wild type of ClpP and inhibition of septum formation is by direct interference of ADEP with the cell division components. Localization studies by GFP-labeled cell divisions proteins demonstrated that ADEP causes delocalization of Ftsz and inhibition of Z-Ring assembly in both species. The impact of ADEP in ∆clpX mutant indicated that ADEP is affecting cell division and that it also inhibits Z-ring assembly. Finally researchers repeat the experiment with ∆ClpP mutant to confirm that the presence of ADEP decreases abundance of FtsZ through ClpP degradation.

In 2013, scientists at Northeastern University performed an experiment focused on how ADEP 4/ClpP works. The experimental results showed the efficiency of ADEP4 when it is combined with other antibiotics. Researchers monitored the amount of trypic peptides, and found out that ADEP4/ClpP induces peptide degradation in a biofilm system. By using Mueller-Hinton broth they demonstrated that ADEP 4 was more effective than other antibiotics such as rifampicin or vancomycin. However, they observed the same trends where ADEP4 combined to rifampicin is more effective and actually eradicates all stationary phases. The in vitro results showed the efficiency of ADEP 4 in mice infected with 4 different strains S. aureus, the laboratory strain SA113, and clinical isolates USA300, UAMS-1 and strain 37.

== Chemistry ==
ADEPs are naturally occurring antibiotics. Certain bacteria produce them as defense mechanism in antagonist bacterial interactions. For instance, Streptomyces species produce them as secondary metabolites.

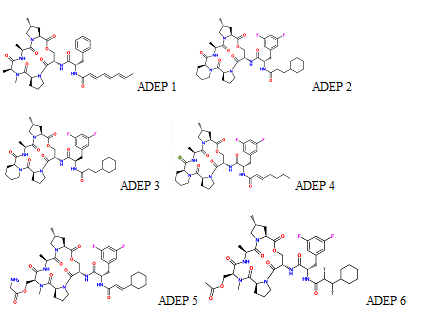
ADEP 1 and its synthetic congeners

There are 6 forms of acyl depsipeptides that are distinguishable by their chemical structure and function. ADEPs generally differ by one or two functional groups that give some of them more flexibility, and stability. Their chemical structures are derived from ADEP 1 and are slightly different from one another. For instance, the only difference between ADEP 2 and ADEP 3 is the conformation of the difluorophenylalanine side chain. ADEP 2 has an S configuarion while ADEP 3 has an R configuarion.

=== Molecular modification ===
In order to develop a useful antibiotic, ADEP continues to be modified for greater antimicrobial activity and stability. By restricting components of ADEP to decrease the molecule's flexibility, binding was enhanced and antimicrobial activity significantly increased. Specific amino acids essential to the peptidolactone core of ADEP were altered and restricted, causing stabilization of ADEP in a bioactive conformation. In fact, the conformational restrictions of ADEP resulted in its ability to activate ClpP increasing seven-fold and its antimicrobial activity 1200-fold. Research on altering ADEP molecules continues in attempt to construct a new antibiotic for public use.
