= Pristinamycin IIB =

Names
- Other names (27R)-26,27-Dihydrovirginiamycin M1; Ostreogrycin G; Virginiamycin M2; Volpristin

Identifiers
CAS Number	21102-49-8
3D model (JSmol)	Interactive image
ChemSpider	4952854
ECHA InfoCard	100.132.888
PubChem CID	6450239
UNII	18UAN5144E
CompTox Dashboard (EPA)	DTXSID10864978
- InChI: InChI=1S/C28H37N3O7/c1-17(2)26-19(4)7-8-24(34)29-10-5-6-18(3)12-21(32)13-22(33)14-25-30-23(16-37-25)27(35)31-11-9-20(15-31)28(36)38-26/h5-8,12,16-17,19-21,26,32H,9-11,13-15H2,1-4H3,(H,29,34)/b6-5+,8-7+,18-12+/t19-,20+,21-,26-/m1/s1 Key: WMKFEQGQMBSGSA-TXZFEVTPSA-N
- SMILES: O[C@H](/C=C(C)/C=C/CNC(/C=C/[C@@H](C)[C@H](OC1=O)C(C)C)=O)CC(CC2=NC(C(N3[C@@H]1CCC3)=O)=CO2)=O

Properties
Chemical formula	C_{28}H_{37}N_{3}O_{7}
Molar mass	527.618 g·mol^{−1}
- Except where otherwise noted, data are given for materials in their standard state (at 25 °C [77 °F], 100 kPa). Infobox references

Pristinamycin IIB is an antibiotic of the streptogramin A class. It was isolated from Streptomyces pristinaespiralis and its chemical structure was first determined in 1966.

== See also ==
- Pristinamycin IIA
