= RRNA (adenine-N6-)-methyltransferase =

Enzyme

rRNA (adenine-N6-)-methyltransferase

Identifiers
- EC no.: 2.1.1.48
- CAS no.: 9076-81-7

Databases
- IntEnz: IntEnz view
- BRENDA: BRENDA entry
- ExPASy: NiceZyme view
- KEGG: KEGG entry
- MetaCyc: metabolic pathway
- PRIAM: profile
- PDB structures: RCSB PDB PDBe PDBsum
- Gene Ontology: AmiGO / QuickGO
Search
- PMC: articles
- PubMed: articles
- NCBI: proteins

In enzymology, a rRNA (adenine-N6-)-methyltransferase (EC 2.1.1.48) is an enzyme that catalyzes the chemical reaction

S-adenosyl-L-methionine + rRNA $\rightleftharpoons$ S-adenosyl-L-homocysteine + rRNA containing N^{6}-methyladenine

Thus, the two substrates of this enzyme are S-adenosyl methionine and rRNA, whereas its two products are S-adenosylhomocysteine and rRNA containing N6-methyladenine.

This enzyme belongs to the family of transferases, specifically those transferring one-carbon group methyltransferases. The systematic name of this enzyme class is S-adenosyl-L-methionine:rRNA (adenine-N6-)-methyltransferase. Other names in common use include ribosomal ribonucleate adenine 6-methyltransferase, gene ksgA methyltransferase, ribonucleic acid-adenine (N6) methylase, ErmC 23S rRNA methyltransferase, and S-adenosyl-L-methionine:rRNA (adenine-6-N-)-methyltransferase.

== Structural studies ==
As of late 2007, 6 structures have been solved for this class of enzymes, with PDB accession codes 1QAM, 1QAN, 1QAO, 1QAQ, 1YUB, and 2ERC.
