= Streptomyces lincolnensis =

Scientific classification
- Domain: Bacteria
- Kingdom: Bacillati
- Phylum: Actinomycetota
- Class: Actinomycetes
- Order: Streptomycetales
- Family: Streptomycetaceae
- Genus: Streptomyces
- Species: S. lincolnensis

Binomial name
- Streptomyces lincolnensis Mason et al. 1963 (Approved Lists 1980)

Species of bacterium

Streptomyces lincolnensis is a bacterium species in the type genus Streptomyces.

D-Lincosamine, an antibiotic from Streptomyces lincolnensis; it is the carbohydrate component of lincomycin. Structure shows the alpha-anomer

S. lincolnensis produces the antibacterial lincomycin. It also produces valienol, a C-7 cyclitol similar in structure to valienamine.

The name of the species is derived from Lincoln, Nebraska.

== See also ==
- List of Streptomyces species
