= Streptomyces caelestis =

Scientific classification
- Domain: Bacteria
- Kingdom: Bacillati
- Phylum: Actinomycetota
- Class: Actinomycetes
- Order: Streptomycetales
- Family: Streptomycetaceae
- Genus: Streptomyces
- Species: S. caelestis

Binomial name
- Streptomyces caelestis de Boer et al. 1955

Type strain
- AS 4.1529, AS 4.1688, ATCC 14924, ATCC 15084, ATCC 19733, BCRC 13685, CBS 472.68, CBS 967.70, CCRC 13685, CGMCC 4.1529, CGMCC 4.1688, D-52 (UC 2011), DSM 40084, ETH 24258, ETH 24399, IFO 12749, IMET 43502, ISP 5084, JCM 4218, JCM 4566, KCC S-0218, KCC S-0566, KCCS- 0218, KCCS-0566, LMG 5970, LMG 8586, NBRC 12749, NCIB 9751, NCIM 2870, NCIMB 9751, NRRL 2418, NRRL B-2418, RIA 1014, SP 5084, UC2011, Upjohn Co. D-52, Upjohn Co. UC 2011, Upjohn. Co. D-52, UT 6026, VKM Ac-1822

Species of bacterium

Streptomyces caelestis is a bacterium species from the genus of Streptomyces which has been isolated from soil in Utah in the United States. Streptomyces caelestis produces desalicetin, isocelesticetin B, caelesticetin, citreamicin θ A, citreamicin θ B, citreaglycon A and dehydrocitreaglycon.

== See also ==
- List of Streptomyces species
