= Quinupristin =

Chemical compound

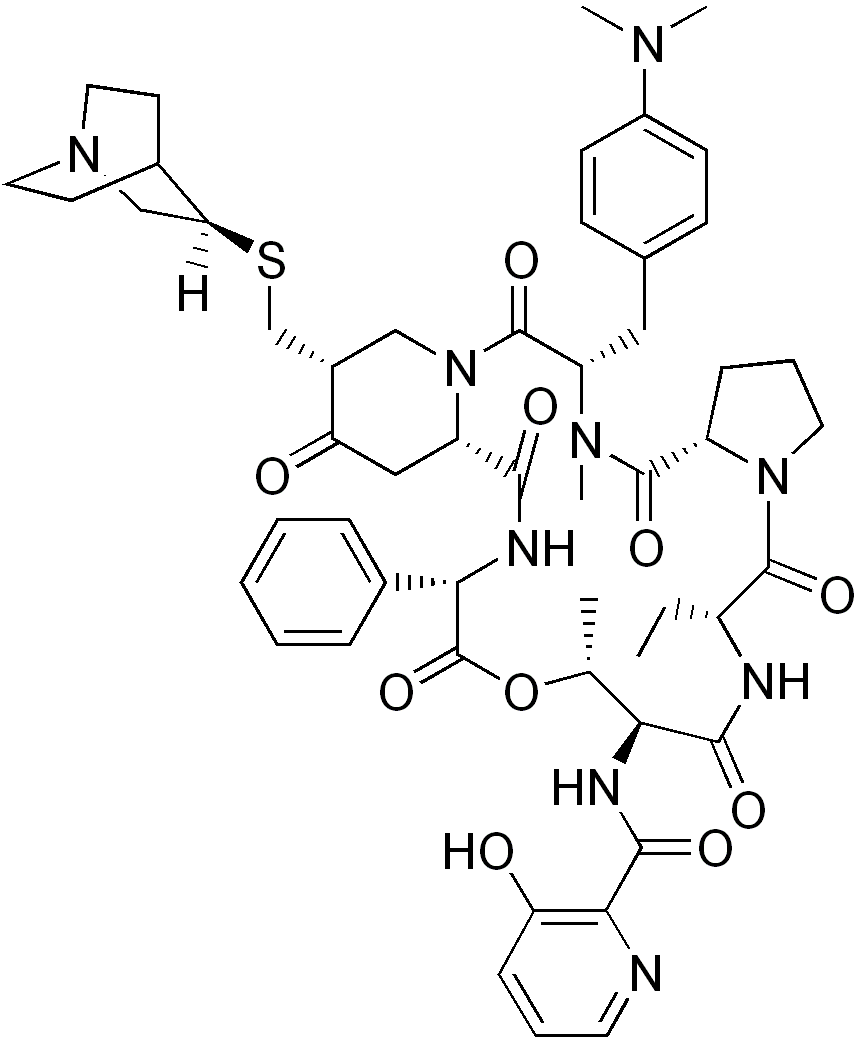

Pharmacokinetic data
- Elimination half-life: 3.1 hours

Identifiers
- IUPAC name: N-{(6R,9S,10R,13S,15aS,18R,22S,24aS)-18- {[(3S)-1-azabicyclo[2.2.2]oct-3-ylthio]methyl}-22-[4-(dimethylamino)benzyl]- 6-ethyl-10,23-dimethyl-5,8,12,15,17,21,24-heptaoxo-13-phenyldocosahydro-12H- pyrido[2,1-f]pyrrolo-[2,1-l][1,4,7,10,13,16] oxapentaazacyclononadecin-9-yl}-3- hydroxypyridine-2-carboxamide
- CAS Number: 120138-50-3
- PubChem CID: 5388937
- ChemSpider: 4470884
- UNII: 23OW28RS7P
- ChEMBL: ChEMBL1200649
- CompTox Dashboard (EPA): DTXSID00873377

Chemical and physical data
- Formula: C_{53}H_{67}N_{9}O_{10}S
- Molar mass: 1022.23 g·mol^{−1}
- 3D model (JSmol): Interactive image
- SMILES: CC[C@@H]1C(=O)N2CCC[C@H]2C(=O)N([C@H](C(=O)N3C[C@H](C(=O)C[C@H]3C(=O)N[C@H](C(=O)O[C@@H]([C@@H](C(=O)N1)NC(=O)C4=C(C=CC=N4)O)C)C5=CC=CC=C5)CS[C@@H]6CN7CCC6CC7)CC8=CC=C(C=C8)N(C)C)C
- InChI: InChI=1S/C53H67N9O10S/c1-6-37-50(68)61-23-11-14-38(61)51(69)59(5)40(26-32-16-18-36(19-17-32)58(3)4)52(70)62-28-35(30-73-43-29-60-24-20-33(43)21-25-60)42(64)27-39(62)47(65)57-45(34-12-8-7-9-13-34)53(71)72-31(2)44(48(66)55-37)56-49(67)46-41(63)15-10-22-54-46/h7-10,12-13,15-19,22,31,33,35,37-40,43-45,63H,6,11,14,20-21,23-30H2,1-5H3,(H,55,66)(H,56,67)(H,57,65)/t31-,35+,37-,38+,39+,40+,43-,44+,45+/m1/s1; Key:WTHRRGMBUAHGNI-LCYNINFDSA-N

Quinupristin is a streptogramin B antibiotic, used in combination with dalfopristin under the trade name Synercid. It has activity against Gram-positive and atypical bacteria but not Gram-negative bacteria. It inhibits bacterial protein synthesis. The combination of quinupristin and dalfopristin is not active against Enterococcus faecalis and needs to be given in combination with other antibacterials for mixed infections that involve Gram-negative organisms.
