= Pristinamycin IIA =

Chemical compound

Clinical data
- Other names: Mikamycin A; Virginiamycin M1

Identifiers
- IUPAC name: 8,9,14,15,24,25-Hexahydro-14-hydroxy-4,12-dimethyl-3-(1-methylethyl)(3R,4R,5E,10E,12E,14S)-3H-21,18-nitrolo-1H,22H-pyrrolo\[2,1-c][1,8,4,19]-dioxadiazacyclotetracosine-1,7,16,22(4H,17H)-tetrone
- CAS Number: 21411-53-0
- PubChem CID: 5354042
- ChemSpider: 10222381
- UNII: 8W4UOL59AZ
- ChEBI: CHEBI:9997
- CompTox Dashboard (EPA): DTXSID30873800

Chemical and physical data
- Formula: C_{28}H_{35}N_{3}O_{7}
- Molar mass: 525.602 g·mol^{−1}
- 3D model (JSmol): Interactive image
- SMILES: C[C@@H]1/C=C/C(=O)NC/C=C/C(=C/[C@H](CC(=O)Cc2nc(co2)C(=O)N3CCC=C3C(=O)O[C@@H]1C(C)C)O)/C
- InChI: InChI=1S/C28H35N3O7/c1-17(2)26-19(4)9-10-24(34)29-11-5-7-18(3)13-20(32)14-21(33)15-25-30-22(16-37-25)27(35)31-12-6-8-23(31)28(36)38-26/h5,7-10,13,16-17,19-20,26,32H,6,11-12,14-15H2,1-4H3,(H,29,34)/b7-5+,10-9+,18-13+/t19-,20-,26-/m1/s1; Key:DAIKHDNSXMZDCU-FQTGFAPKSA-N

Pristinamycin IIA is a macrolide antibiotic. It is a member of the streptogramin A group of antibiotics and one component of pristinamycin (the other being pristinamycin IA). Pristinamycin IIA was first isolated from the Streptomyces virginiae, but has been isolated from other microorganisms and thus has been given a variety of other names such as Virginiamycin M1, Mikamycin A, and Streptogramin A. Pristinamycin IIA structure was determined by chemical and instrumental techniques, including X-ray crystallography. Pristinamycin IIA is of interest from a biosynthetic viewpoint because it contains the unusual dehydroproline and oxazole ring systems. The only experimental evidence bearing on the formation of the oxazole ring is found in work on the biosynthesis of the alkaloid annuloline.

== Biosynthesis ==
Pristinamycin IIA biosynthesis is presumed to proceed through the acetate pathway and was determined through the feeding of ^{3}H and ^{13}C precursors to Streptomyces virginiae strain PDT-30. When fed [2-^{13}C]-acetate the 13C NMR Spectra showed signals corresponding to carbons 5, 9, 10a, 11, 13, and 15 seen in the biosynthesis scheme. In addition, methionine was found to donate its methyl group specifically to carbon-3 (seen in the biosynthesis scheme) by studies with L-[methyl-^{13}C] methionine. With this data and the known incorporation of proline, methionine, serine, and glycine into the antibiotic along with the assumption that carbon atoms 1, la, lb, and 2 are derived from valine or isobutyric acid, allows for a tentative pathway for the biosynthesis of Pristinamycin IIA to be deduced.

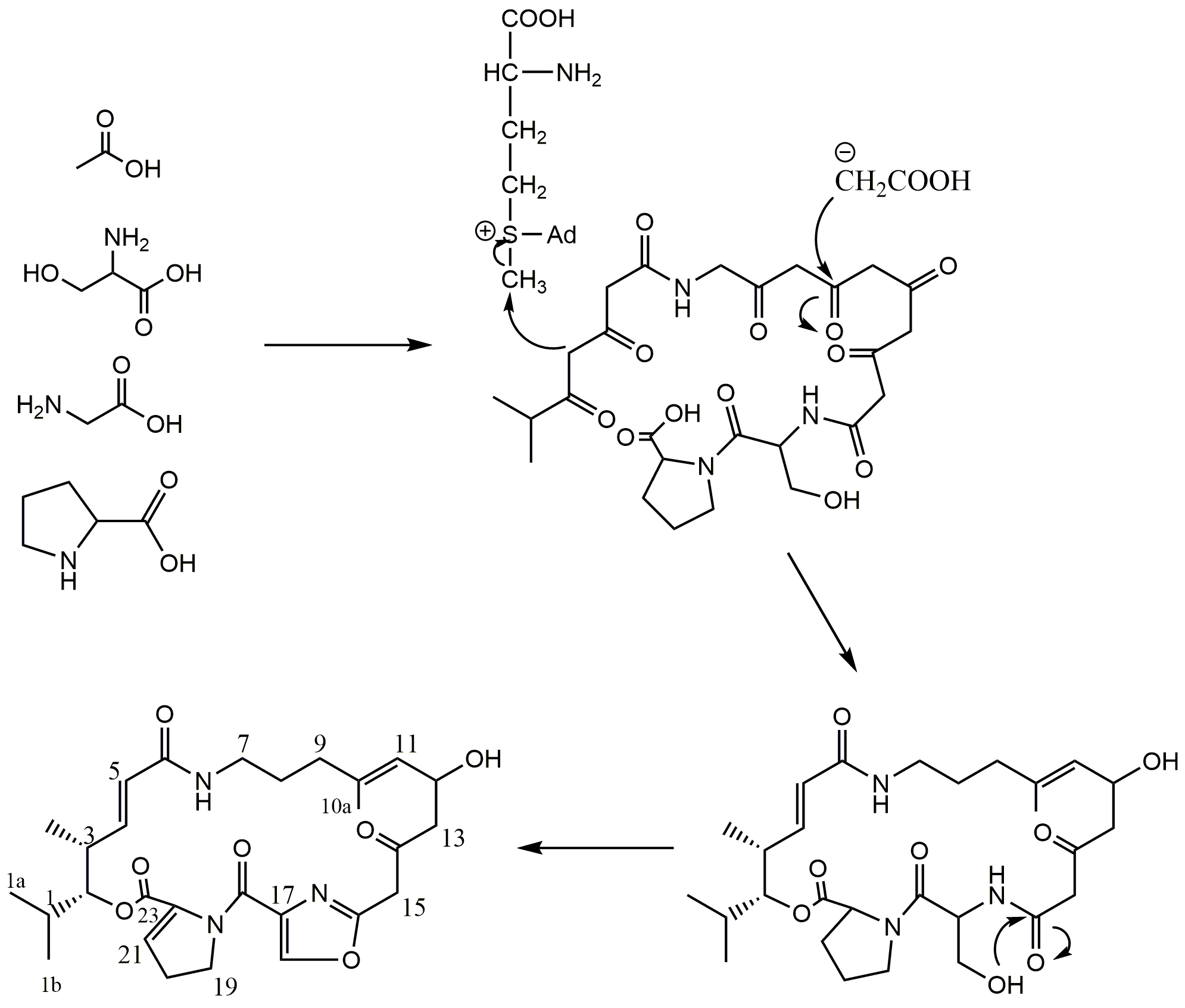
Biosynthesis of Pristinamycin IIA

== See also ==
- Pristinamycin IIB
