= RPRD2 =

Protein-coding gene in humans

Identifiers
- Aliases: RPRD2, KIAA0460, HSPC099, regulation of nuclear pre-mRNA domain containing 2
- External IDs: OMIM: 614695; MGI: 1922387; GeneCards: RPRD2
Available structures
PDB	Ortholog search: PDBe RCSB
PDB	List of PDB id codes 4FLB

Gene location (Human)
Chr.	Chromosome 1 (human)
Band	1q21.2	Start	150,363,091 bp
Band	1q21.2	End	150,476,566 bp

Gene location (Mouse)
Chr.	Chromosome 3 (mouse)
Band	3|3 F2.1	Start	95,667,653 bp
Band	3|3 F2.1	End	95,726,175 bp
RNA expression pattern
Bgee	Human / Mouse (ortholog); Top expressed in: buccal mucosa cell; superficial temporal artery; oocyte; olfactory bulb; thoracic diaphragm; nipple; endothelial cell; renal medulla; cardia; germinal epithelium / Top expressed in: secondary oocyte; tail of embryo; cumulus cell; Rostral migratory stream; genital tubercle; atrioventricular valve; endocardial cushion; muscle of thigh; primitive streak; granulocyte; More reference expression data
BioGPS	n/a
Gene ontology
Molecular function	RNA polymerase II complex binding
Cellular component	RNA polymerase II, holoenzyme; nucleoplasm
Biological process	snRNA transcription by RNA polymerase II; mRNA 3'-end processing
Sources:Amigo / QuickGO
Orthologs
Databases	NCBI: entry; OMA: entry
Species	Human	Mouse
Entrez	23248	75137
Ensembl	ENSG00000163125	ENSMUSG00000028106
UniProt	Q5VT52	Q6NXI6
RefSeq (mRNA)	NM_001297673; NM_001297674; NM_015203	NM_001081293; NM_028328; NM_029180; NM_001368178; NM_001368179 NM_001368180; NM_001368181
RefSeq (protein)	NP_001284602; NP_001284603; NP_056018	NP_001074762; NP_001355107; NP_001355108; NP_001355109; NP_001355110 NP_082604
Location (UCSC)	Chr 1: 150.36 – 150.48 Mb	Chr 3: 95.67 – 95.73 Mb
PubMed search
- Wikidata
View/Edit Human	View/Edit Mouse

Regulation of nuclear pre-mRNA domain-containing protein 2 is a protein that in humans is encoded by the RPRD2 gene. The RPRD2 protein is part of the transcription preinitiation complex, and is therefore involved with the DNA to RNA transcription process, and in particular mRNA 3' end processing.
