= Pristinamycin IA =

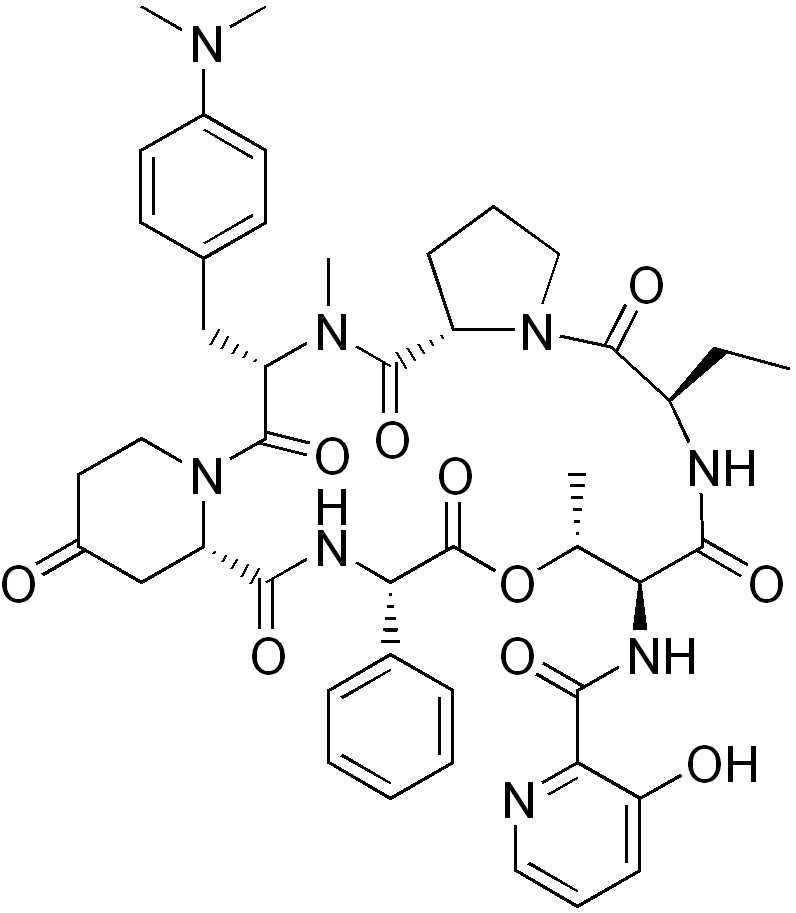

Names
- Other names Mikamycin B; Mikamycin IA; NSC 92554; PA 114B; Pristinamycin P 1; Streptogramin B; Vernamycin B

Identifiers
CAS Number	3131-03-1
3D model (JSmol)	Interactive image
ChEBI	CHEBI:8417
ChEMBL	ChEMBL1256399
ChemSpider	9311783
PubChem CID	11136668
UNII	V50XJ0NC3I
- InChI: InChI=1S/C45H54N8O10/c1-6-31-42(59)52-22-11-14-32(52)43(60)51(5)34(24-27-16-18-29(19-17-27)50(3)4)44(61)53-23-20-30(54)25-33(53)39(56)49-37(28-12-8-7-9-13-28)45(62)63-26(2)36(40(57)47-31)48-41(58)38-35(55)15-10-21-46-38/h7-10,12-13,15-19,21,26,31-34,36-37,55H,6,11,14,20,22-25H2,1-5H3,(H,47,57)(H,48,58)(H,49,56)/t26-,31-,32+,33+,34+,36+,37+/m1/s1 Key: YGXCETJZBDTKRY-DZCVGBHJSA-N; InChI=1/C45H54N8O10/c1-6-31-42(59)52-22-11-14-32(52)43(60)51(5)34(24-27-16-18-29(19-17-27)50(3)4)44(61)53-23-20-30(54)25-33(53)39(56)49-37(28-12-8-7-9-13-28)45(62)63-26(2)36(40(57)47-31)48-41(58)38-35(55)15-10-21-46-38/h7-10,12-13,15-19,21,26,31-34,36-37,55H,6,11,14,20,22-25H2,1-5H3,(H,47,57)(H,48,58)(H,49,56)/t26-,31-,32+,33+,34+,36+,37+/m1/s1 Key: YGXCETJZBDTKRY-DZCVGBHJBI
- SMILES: CC[C@@H]1C(=O)N2CCC[C@H]2C(=O)N([C@H](C(=O)N3CCC(=O)C[C@H]3C(=O)N[C@H](C(=O)O[C@@H]([C@@H](C(=O)N1)NC(=O)C4=C(C=CC=N4)O)C)C5=CC=CC=C5)CC6=CC=C(C=C6)N(C)C)C

Properties
Chemical formula	C_{45}H_{54}N_{8}O_{10}
Molar mass	866.973 g·mol^{−1}
- Except where otherwise noted, data are given for materials in their standard state (at 25 °C [77 °F], 100 kPa). verify (what is ?) Infobox references

Pristinamycin IA (mikamycin B) is an antibiotic cyclic peptide. It is a member of the streptogramin B group of antibiotics and one component of pristinamycin (the other being pristinamycin IIA).
