= Streptomyces virginiae =

Scientific classification
- Domain: Bacteria
- Kingdom: Bacillati
- Phylum: Actinomycetota
- Class: Actinomycetes
- Order: Streptomycetales
- Family: Streptomycetaceae
- Genus: Streptomyces
- Species: S. virginiae

Binomial name
- Streptomyces virginiae Grundy et al. 1952

Type strain
- Abbott Labs NA255-B8, AS 4.1530, ATCC 19817, BCRC 12069, CBS 291.60, CBS 314.55, CBS 570.68, CCRC 12069, CGMCC 4.1530, DSM 40094, ETH 14322, ETH 20730, IFO 12827, IFO 3729, IMRU 3651, ISP 5094, JCM 4425, KCC S-0425, KCTC 1747, M808, MTCC 4730, NA255-B8, NBRC 12827, NBRC 3729, NRRL B-1446, NRRL-ISP 5094, PSA 75, RIA 1097, UNIQEM 205, VKM Ac-1218, Waksman 3652

Synonyms
- Streptomyces cinnamonensis Okami 1952 (Approved Lists 1980)

Species of bacterium

Streptomyces virginiae is a bacterium species from the genus of Streptomyces which has been isolated from soil. Streptomyces virginiae produces actithiazic acid, virginiamycins and cycloserine. Streptomyces virginiae also produces monensin A, monensin B, monensin C, monensin D, actithiazic acid.

== See also ==
- List of Streptomyces species
