= Quinupristin/dalfopristin =

Combination drug

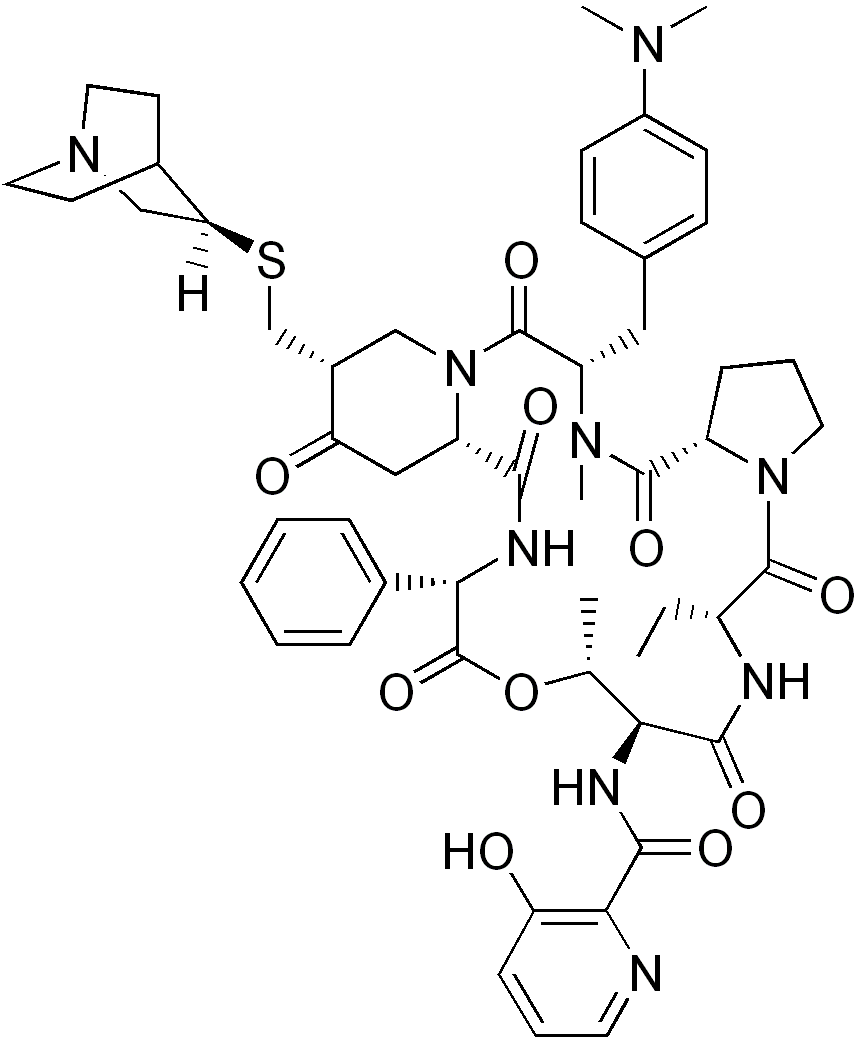

- Quinupristin (top) and dalfopristin (bottom)

Combination of
- Quinupristin: Streptogramin antibiotic
- Dalfopristin: Streptogramin antibiotic

Clinical data
- Pregnancy category: AU: B3; B (U.S.)
- Routes of administration: IV
- ATC code: J01FG02 (WHO)

Legal status
- Legal status: US: ℞-only

Identifiers
- CAS Number: 126602-89-9
- PubChem CID: 23724510
- ChemSpider: 21106373

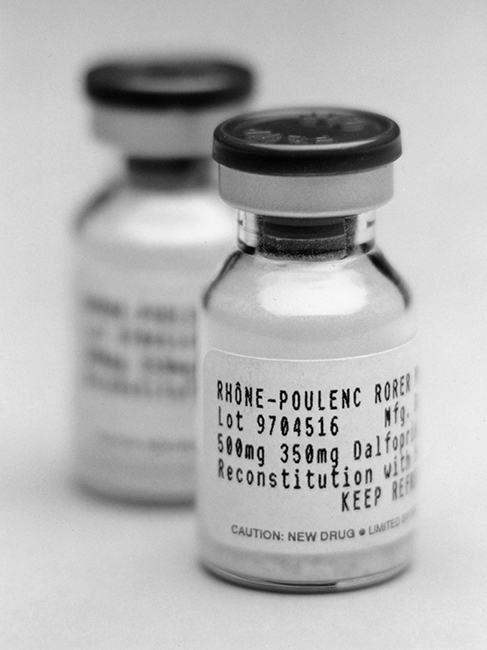
Synercid vial in 1997

Quinupristin/dalfopristin, or quinupristin-dalfopristin, (pronunciation: kwi NYOO pris tin / dal FOE pris tin) (trade name Synercid) is a combination of two antibiotics used to treat infections caused by staphylococci and by vancomycin-resistant Enterococcus faecium.

Quinupristin and dalfopristin are both streptogramin antibiotics, derived from pristinamycin. Quinupristin is derived from pristinamycin IA; dalfopristin from pristinamycin IIA. They are combined in a weight-to-weight ratio of 30% quinupristin to 70% dalfopristin. Discontinued 2022, there are no other manufacturers of this medication.

== Administration ==
Intravenous, usually 7.5 mg/kg every 8 hours (infections/life threatening VRSA); every 12 hours (skin infections). No renal dosing adjustments, hepatic dosing adjustments are not defined, consider reducing dose.

== Mechanism of action ==
Quinupristin and dalfopristin are protein synthesis inhibitors in a synergistic manner. While each of the two is only a bacteriostatic agent, the combination shows bactericidal activity.

- Dalfopristin binds to the 23S portion of the 50S ribosomal subunit, and changes the conformation of it, enhancing the binding of quinupristin by a factor of about 100. In addition, it inhibits peptidyl transfer.
- Quinupristin binds to a nearby site on the 50S ribosomal subunit and prevents elongation of the polypeptide, as well as causing incomplete chains to be released.

== Pharmacokinetics ==
Clearance by the liver CYP450:3A4 inhibitor, half-life quinupristin 0.8 hours, dalfopristin 0.7 hours (with persistence of effects for 9–10 hours).

== Side effects ==
[2]

Serious:

1. C.diff-associated diarrhea
2. superinfection
3. anaphylactoid reactions
4. angioedema

Common:

1. Joint aches (arthralgia) or muscle aches (myalgia)
2. Nausea, diarrhea (C. diff associated) or vomiting
3. Rash or itching
4. Headache
5. Hyperbilirubinemia
6. Anemia
7. Thrombophlebitis

== Drug interactions ==
The drug inhibits P450 and enhances the effects of terfenadine, astemizole, indinavir, midazolam, calcium channel blockers, warfarin, cisapride and ciclosporin.
