= Multidrug-resistant bacteria =

Bacteria resistant to three or more classes of antimicrobial drugs

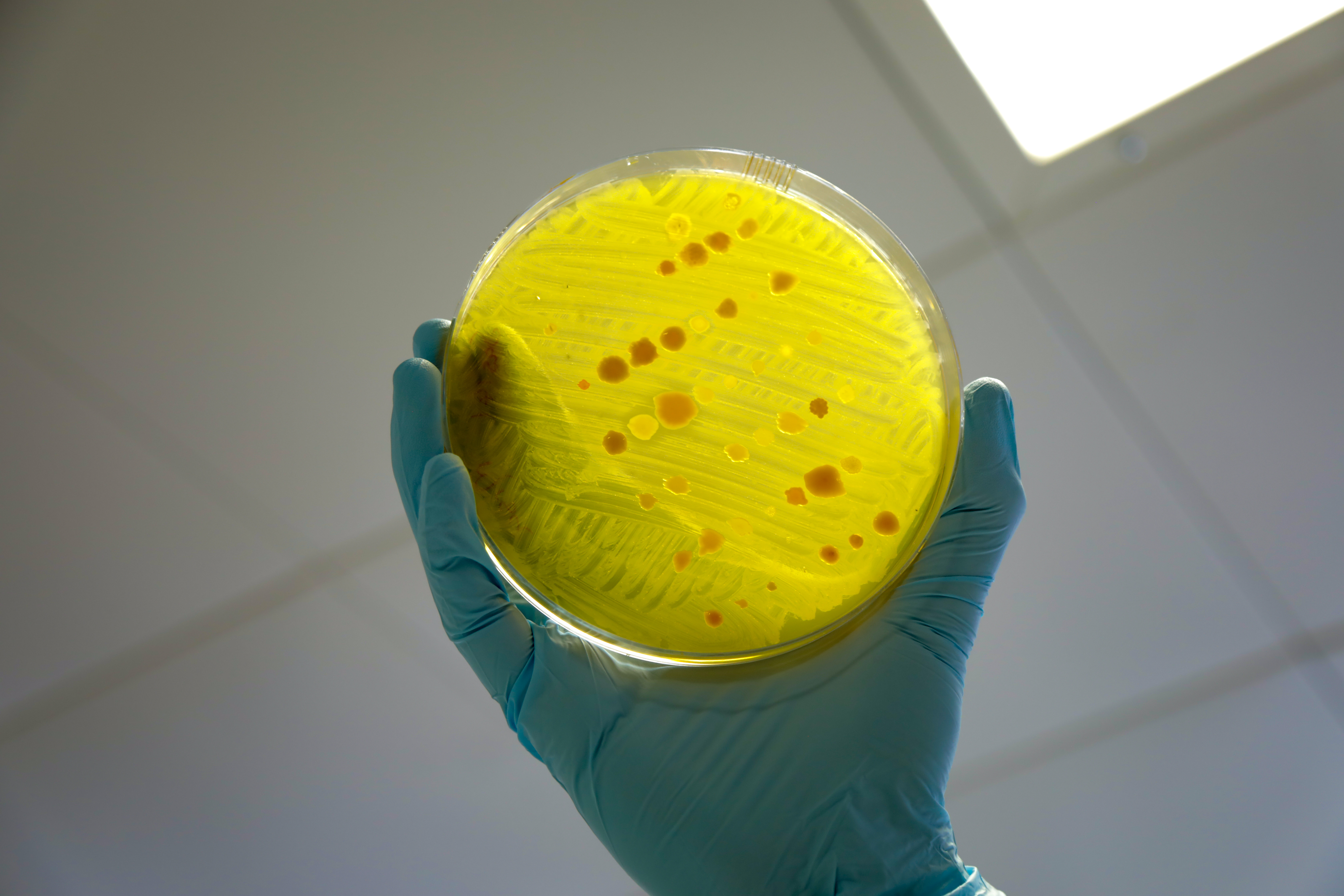
A variety of different bacteria - testing for antimicrobial resistance

Multidrug-resistant (MDR) bacteria are bacteria that are resistant to three or more classes of antimicrobial drugs, making them hard to treat. MDR bacteria have seen an increase in prevalence in recent years and pose serious risks to public health. Previously, MDR bacteria were primarily associated with hospital-acquired infections, but have increasingly become a major cause of community-acquired infections. The spread of MDR bacteria in society has led to increased morbidity, mortality and economic burden. MDR bacteria can be broken into 3 main categories: Gram-positive, Gram-negative, and other (acid-stain). These bacteria employ various adaptations to avoid or mitigate the damage done by antimicrobials. With increased access to modern medicine there has been a sharp increase in the amount of antibiotics consumed. Given the abundant use of antibiotics there has been a considerable increase in the evolution of antimicrobial resistance factors, now outpacing the development of new antibiotics.

== Examples identified as serious threats to public health ==
Examples of MDR bacteria identified as serious threats to public health include:

Gram-positive MDR bacteria

- Clostridioides difficile
- Staphylococcus aureus
- Vancomycin-resistant Enterococcus
- Streptococcus pneumoniae

Gram-negative MDR bacteria

- Carbapenem-resistant Acinetobacter
- Escherichia coli
- Klebsiella pneumoniae
- Enterobacter spp.
- Neisseria gonorrhoeae
- Campylobacter
- Pseudomonas aeruginosa
- Salmonella
- Shigella

Other MDR bacteria

- Mycobacterium tuberculosis

== Microbial adaptations ==
MDR bacteria employ a plurality of adaptations to overcome the environmental insults caused by antibiotics. Bacteria are capable of sharing these resistance factors in a process called horizontal gene transfer where resistant bacteria share genetic information that encodes resistance to the naive population.

- Antibiotic inactivation: bacteria create proteins that can prevent damage caused by antibiotics, they can do this in two ways. First, inactivating or modifying the antibiotic so that it can no longer interact with its target. Second, degrading the antibiotic directly.
- Multidrug efflux pumps: The use of transporter proteins to expel the antibiotic.
- Modification of target sites: mutating or modifying elements of the bacteria structure to prevent interaction with the antibiotic.
- Structural modifications: mutating or modifying global elements of cell to adapt to Antibiotic (Such as increased acid tolerance to an acidic antimicrobial)

== Alternative antimicrobial methods ==
=== Phage therapy ===
Bacteriophage therapy, commonly known as 'phage therapy,' uses bacteria-specific viruses to kill antibiotic resistant bacteria. Phage therapy offers considerably higher specificity as the phage can be engineered to only infect a certain bacteria species. Phage therapy also allows for the possibility of biofilm penetration in cases where antibiotics are ineffective due to the increased resistance of biofilm-forming pathogens. One major drawback to phage therapy is the evolution of phage-resistant microbes which was seen in a majority of phage therapy experiments aimed to treat sepsis and intestinal infection. Recent studies suggest that development of phage resistance comes as a trade-off for antibiotic resistance and can be used to create antibiotic-sensitive populations.
