= Etamycin =

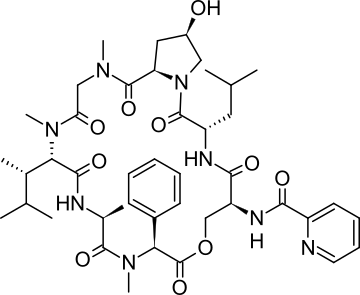

Names
- Other names Viridogrisein I, Etamycin A, Neoviridogrisein IV, Antibiotic K-179, Antibiotic F-1370A

Identifiers
CAS Number	299-20-7
3D model (JSmol)	Interactive image
ChemSpider	32056952
PubChem CID	196972
UNII	PAF72P8T3G
- InChI: InChI=1S/C44H62N8O11/c1-23(2)19-30-42(60)52-21-29(53)20-31(52)43(61)49(8)22-33(55)50(9)36(25(5)24(3)4)40(58)46-26(6)41(59)51(10)37(28-15-12-11-13-16-28)44(62)63-27(7)34(38(56)47-30)48-39(57)35-32(54)17-14-18-45-35/h11-18,23-27,29-31,34,36-37,53-54H,19-22H2,1-10H3,(H,46,58)(H,47,56)(H,48,57)/t25?,26-,27-,29+,30+,31+,34-,36-,37-/m0/s1 Key: SATIISJKSAELDC-QPFUEGANSA-N; InChI=1/C44H62N8O11/c1-23(2)19-30-42(60)52-21-29(53)20-31(52)43(61)49(8)22-33(55)50(9)36(25(5)24(3)4)40(58)46-26(6)41(59)51(10)37(28-15-12-11-13-16-28)44(62)63-27(7)34(38(56)47-30)48-39(57)35-32(54)17-14-18-45-35/h11-18,23-27,29-31,34,36-37,53-54H,19-22H2,1-10H3,(H,46,58)(H,47,56)(H,48,57)/t25?,26-,27-,29+,30+,31+,34-,36-,37-/m0/s1 Key: SATIISJKSAELDC-QPFUEGANBR
- SMILES: C[C@@H]1[C@@H](C(=O)N[C@@H](C(=O)N2C[C@@H](C[C@@H]2C(=O)N(CC(=O)N(C(C(=O)N[C@H](C(=O)N([C@H](C(=O)O1)C3=CC=CC=C3)C)C)[C@@H](C)C(C)C)C)C)O)CC(C)C)NC(=O)C4=C(C=CC=N4)O

Properties
Chemical formula	C_{44}H_{62}N_{8}O_{11}
Molar mass	879.025 g·mol^{−1}
- Except where otherwise noted, data are given for materials in their standard state (at 25 °C [77 °F], 100 kPa). Infobox references

Etamycin, also known as viridogrisein, is a cyclic peptide antibiotic isolate of marine actinomycete. Etamycin was first isolated from a Streptomyces species in 1957 by Lawson and co-workers.
