= Streptogramin B =

Subgroup of the streptogramin antibiotics family

Streptogramin B is a subgroup of the streptogramin antibiotics family. These natural products are cyclic hexa- or hepta depsipeptides produced by various members of the genus of bacteria Streptomyces. Many of the members of the streptogramins reported in the literature have the same structure and different names; for example, pristinamycin IA = vernamycin Bα = mikamycin B = osteogrycin B.

== Biosynthesis ==
The biosynthesis of streptogramin B is carried out by large multifunctional enzymes called non-ribosomal peptide synthetases (NRPS). In the NRPS system, each amino acid is activated as an aminoacyladenylate and is linked to the enzyme as a thioester with a phosphopantetheinyl group. An elongation reaction then occurs by transferring the activated carboxyl to the amino group in the next amino acid, thus executing the N-to-C stepwise condensation.

NRPSs contain several modules on a single polypeptide. Each of these modules can catalyze activation, condensation and a modification reaction specific to one kind of amino acid. A typical elongation module consists of an adenylation domain (A), a peptidyl carrier protein domain (PCP) and a condensation domain (C). Some other domains may be present that are responsible for modifications to the residues, such as epimerization domain (E) and N-methyltransferase domain (MT). The domain responsible for the termination is the thioesterase domain (TE) located in the final module.

=== Amino acid composition ===
The general amino acid composition of streptogramin B consists of: 3-hydroxypicolinic acid, L-threonine, D-aminobutyric acid, L-proline, 4-N,N-(dimethylamino)-L-phenylalanine, 4-oxo-L-pipecolic acid and phenylglycine.

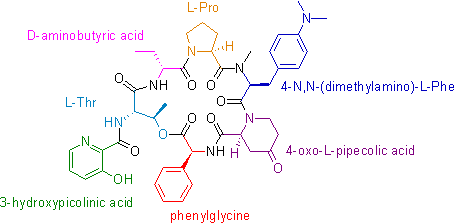

=== Modular arrangement ===
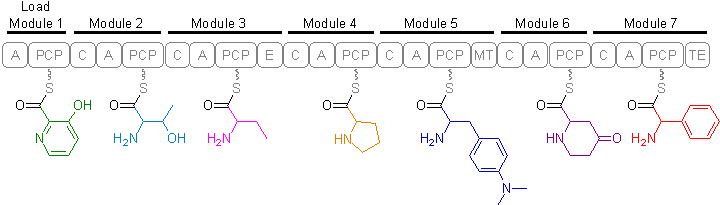

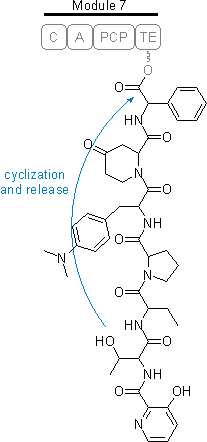

== Mechanism of action ==
Streptogramins A and B synergically inhibit cell growth of gram positive, less so gram negative bacteria by inhibiting protein synthesis, but separately they are bacteriostatic. The molecular target of streptogramins is the 23S rRNA. Both streptogramin A and B bind to the P binding site of the 50S ribosome subunit. The type A streptogramin binding causes a conformational change to the 50S subunit, which increases the activity of the type B streptogramin by a 100-fold. Streptogramin B prevents the elongation of protein chains and causes the release of incomplete peptides.

== Clinical use ==
The streptogramin antibiotics were identified almost 50 years ago, but have only recently found clinical use as a consequence of the increase in multidrug-resistant bacteria. They present poor solubility in aqueous solution, and this has limited their clinical use; however, the natural products still find use as feed additives in agriculture.

Medicinal chemists at Rhône-Poulenc worked in the preparation of semi-synthetic, water-soluble, derivatives of pristinamycin IA (B type streptogramin) and pristinamycin IIA (A type streptogramin) giving rise to quinupristin and dalfopristin, respectively, which, when administered in a 3:7 ratio, comprise the 1999 FDA approved drug Synercid.
