= Streptogramin A =

Group of antibiotics

Streptogramin A is a group of antibiotics within the larger family of antibiotics known as streptogramins. They are synthesized by the bacteria Streptomyces virginiae. The streptogramin family of antibiotics consists of two distinct groups: group A antibiotics contain a 23-membered unsaturated ring with lactone and peptide bonds while group B antibiotics are depsipeptides (lactone-cyclized peptides). While structurally different, these two groups of antibiotics act synergistically, providing greater antibiotic activity than the combined activity of the separate components. These antibiotics have until recently been commercially manufactured as feed additives in agriculture, although today there is increased interest in their ability to combat antibiotic-resistant bacteria, particularly vancomycin-resistant bacteria.

== Biosynthesis ==
Streptogramin A is a polyketide in nature, but contains some amino acid components as well. Its gene cluster codes for a hybrid PKS-NRPS protein that consists of eight PKS modules and two NRPS modules. Other enzymes are required for tailoring of streptogramin A, particularly for the unusual methylation reaction. The figure below shows the origins of the synthetic components of streptogramin A.

The streptogramin A PKS-NRPS is composed of 6 proteins: VirA contains modules 1 though 6; VirF, VirG, and VirH contain modules 6 through 10; VirI is the AT domain that acts for every PKS module; and VirJ contains the TE domain. The starter unit for the biosynthesis of streptogramin A is isobutyryl-CoA, which is given by the amino acid valine after it has undergone transamination and branched-chain keto acid dehydrogenation. Two rounds of chain extension with malonate follow. An NRPS module introduces a glycine residue into the growing polyketide chain, followed by two more rounds of chain extension with malonate. At this point, four enzymes use acetyl-CoA to add a methyl group to position 12 on the macromolecule. The mechanism of the reaction is proposed below. VirC and HMG-CoA synthase bear striking structural similarities and while the mechanism for VirC is not known, it can be proposed to be similar to that of HMG-CoA synthase.

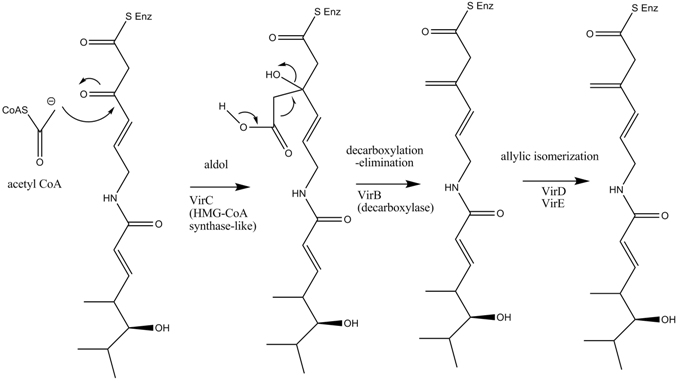

Such an elaborate mechanism of methylation is necessary since SAM is not able to insert a methyl group onto a carbonyl carbon. Another round of malonate extension occurs, followed by the malonate's reaction with an adjacent serine extender to form an oxazole ring. This reaction is catalyzed by a cyclization domain on the Ser9 NRPS module. The diagram below shows the biogenesis of the oxazole ring from serine and malonate.

Finally, a D-proline residue is added to the chain, followed by hydroxylation and dehydration to form dehydroproline, which is thought to occur through a reverse Michael-type reaction.

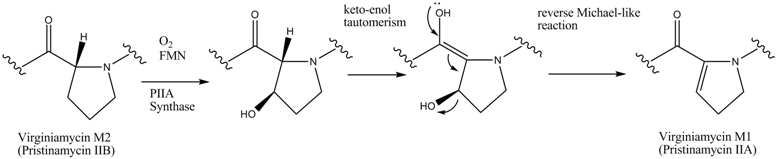

== Mode of action ==
By themselves, streptogramins A and B are bacteriostatic. However, when used in conjunction with one another, the streptogramins can inhibit bacterial growth and are bactericidal. Streptogramin A first binds to the peptidyl transferase domain of the 50s ribosomal subunit, preventing the early events of elongation. The binding of streptogramin A causes a conformational change that increases the ribosomal binding activity of streptogramin B 100-fold. Upon binding the ribosome (which streptogramin B can accomplish at any stage of protein synthesis), streptogramin B prevents protein chain extension and can initiate the release of incomplete peptides. When both streptogramins are bound to the ribosome, they form an extremely stable ternary complex.

Recently, it has been reported how inhibition of the mitochondrial ribosome by streptogramins A (alone or in combination with streptogramins B) can block glioblastoma stem cell growth, thus allowing for potential repurposing of these antibiotics as antineoplastic agents.

In 1999 the FDA had approved Synercid, a drug containing streptogramins A and B in a 7:3 ratio respectively. This intravenously injected drug is used to treat patients with bacteremia caused by vancomycin-resistant Enterococcus faecium.

== Resistance to streptogramins ==
Multiple mechanisms of streptogramin resistance have developed despite Synercid's fairly recent development. The three major mechanisms of resistance include active efflux, covalent target modification and antibiotic inactivation enzymes.
