= Depsipeptide =

Type of peptide

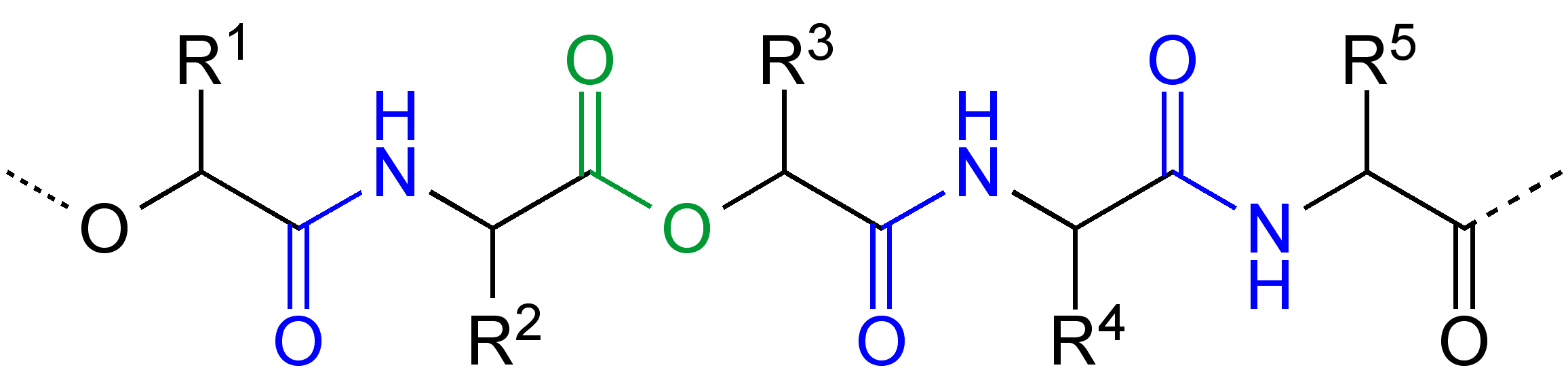
Example of a depsipeptide with 3 amide groups (highlighted blue) and one ester group (highlighted green).

A depsipeptide is a peptide in which one or more amide, -C(O)NHR-, linkages are replaced by the corresponding ester, -C(O)OR-. Depsipeptides usually contain alternating amide and ester linkages. Elimination of an amide linkage in a peptide structure results in a decrease of H-bonding capability, which is responsible for secondary structure within peptides, thus inducing structural warping and diversity. Because of the decreased electron delocalization in esters relative to amides, depsipeptides have lower rotational barriers and therefore are quite flexible and malleable structures. They are mainly produced in nature by soil and marine sediment inhabiting bacteria.

Chemical structure of romidepsin

An example of a depsipeptide drug is the anticancer agent romidepsin, a known histone deacetylase inhibitor (HDACi). It was first isolated as a fermentation product from the soil bacterium Chromobacterium violaceum by the Fujisawa Pharmaceutical Company.

Streptogramins, specifically streptogramin B, are depsipeptides that bind to the 50S subunit of bacterial ribosomes. Etamycin was shown in preliminary data in 2010 to have potent activity against MRSA in a mouse model.

Several depsipeptides from Streptomyces exhibit antimicrobial activity. These form a new, potential class of antibiotics known as acyldepsipeptides (ADEPs). ADEPs target and activate casein lytic protease (ClpP) to initiate uncontrolled peptide and unfolded protein degradation, killing many Gram-positive bacteria.

Depsipeptides can be formed through a Passerini reaction.
