= Paprika oleoresin =

- Major chemical components of paprika oleoresin

Names
- IUPAC names (3R,3′S,5′R)-3,3′-dihydroxy-β,κ-caroten-6′-one (capsanthin) (3S,5R,3′S,5′R)-3,3′-dihydroxy-κ,κ-carotene-6,6′-dione (capsorubin)
- Other names: Paprika extract; Paprika color

Identifiers
CAS Number	68917-78-2
ChEBI	CHEBI:27448
ChemSpider	none
E number	E160c (colours)
PubChem CID	11980947

Properties
Chemical formula	C_{40}H_{56}O_{3} (capsanthin) C_{40}H_{56}O_{4} (capsorubin)
Molar mass	584.87 g/mol (capsanthin) 600.85 g/mol (capsorubin)
Appearance	Reddish viscous liquid
Solubility in water	Insoluble
- Except where otherwise noted, data are given for materials in their standard state (at 25 °C [77 °F], 100 kPa). verify (what is ?) Infobox references

Paprika oleoresin (also known as paprika extract and oleoresin paprika) is an oil-soluble extract from the fruits of Capsicum annuum or Capsicum frutescens, and is primarily used as a colouring and flavouring in food products. It is composed of vegetable oil and capsanthin and capsorubin, the main colouring compounds (among other carotenoids). Commercial products are generally standardized to contain 7% total caretinoids. It is much milder than capsicum oleoresin, often containing relatively little capsaicin.

Extraction is performed by percolation with a variety of solvents, primarily hexane, which are removed prior to use. Vegetable oil is then added to ensure a uniform color saturation.

== Uses ==
Paprika oleoresin and paprika extract, as a colorants are available in two forms:

Paprika oleoresin (E160c(i)) is fat-soluble, obtained by extracting carotenoids from paprika using organic solvents. It is used as a fat-soluble colorant in cheese, sausages, margarine, oils, sauces, snacks, as well as in cosmetics and animal feed. In poultry feed, it is used to deepen the colour of egg yolks.

Paprika extract (E160c(ii)) may be either fat-soluble or water-dispersible. When processed with emulsifiers, it is used in low-fat or water-based products such as sauces, snacks, drinks, and desserts.

In the United States, paprika oleoresin is listed as a color additive “exempt from certification”.

In Europe, "Paprika extract, capsanthin, capsorubin" is assigned E160c.

== Names and CAS nos ==
Trivial Name	Preferred Name	AutoNom Name	Cas No.
Capsaicin	8-Methyl-N-vanillyl-trans-6-nonenamide	(E)-8-Methyl-non-6-enoic acid 4-hydroxy-3-methoxy-benzylamide	404-86-4
Capsanthin	(all-E,3R,3'S,5'R)-3,3'-dihydroxy-β,κ-caroten-6'-one	(2E,4E,6E,8E,10E,12E,14E,16E,18E)-19-((R)-4-Hydroxy-2,6,6-trimethyl-cyclohex-1-enyl)-1-((1R,4S)-4-hydroxy-1,2,2-trimethylcyclopentyl)-4,8,13,17-tetramethyl-nonadeca-2,4,6,8,10,12,14,16,18-nonaen-1-one	465-42-9
Capsorubin	(all-E,3S,3'S,5R,5'R)-3,3'-dihydroxy-κ,κ-carotene-6,6'-dione	(2E,4E,6E,8E,10E,12E,14E,16E,18E)-1,20-Bis-((1R,4S)-4-hydroxy-1,2,2-trimethyl-cyclopentyl)-4,8,13,17-tetramethyl-icosa-2,4,6,8,10,12,14,16,18-nonaene-1,20-dione	470-38-2
