= Antibiomania =

Psychiatric condition induced by antibiotics

- Other names: Antimicrobial-induced mania; Antibiotic-induced mania
- Specialty: Psychiatry

Antibiomania, also known as antibiotic-induced mania or antimicrobial-induced mania, is a rare but serious idiosyncratic adverse reaction in which antibiotic therapy induces mania or hypomania. It has been documented most commonly with clarithromycin, followed by other antibiotics including fluoroquinolones and isoniazid, among others. Psychosis and other symptoms may occur in addition to or instead of mania. Antibiomania is treated by discontinuation of the causative antibiotic, usually resulting in rapid and dramatic improvement, and/or with psychiatric drugs like mood stabilizers, antipsychotics, and benzodiazepines. The mechanisms responsible for antibiomania are unknown, but may be due to off-target central nervous system activities of certain antibiotics or due to disruption of the gut microbiome and gut–brain axis. Elevated cortisol levels have also been observed in antibiomania. More than 100 cases of antibiomania were identified in a major 2002 literature review. The term antibiomania was introduced in this same 2002 review. Psychiatric adverse effects were first associated with antibiotics like penicillin as early as 1948.
