= Capsorubin =

Names
- IUPAC name (3S,5R,3′S,5′R)-3,3'-Dihydroxy-κ,κ-carotene-6,6′-dione
- Systematic IUPAC name (2E,4E,6E,8E,10E,12E,14E,16E,18E)-1,20-Bis[(1R,4S)-4-hydroxy-1,2,2-trimethylcyclopentyl]-4,8,13,17-tetramethylicosa-2,4,6,8,10,12,14,16,18-nonaene-1,20-dione

Identifiers
CAS Number	470-38-2
3D model (JSmol)	Interactive image
ChEBI	CHEBI:3378
ChemSpider	4444641
ECHA InfoCard	100.006.752
EC Number	207-425-2
E number	E160c(ii) (colours)
KEGG	C08585
PubChem CID	5281229
UNII	805VAB3L0H
CompTox Dashboard (EPA)	DTXSID901018116
- InChI: InChI=1S/C40H56O4/c1-29(17-13-19-31(3)21-23-35(43)39(9)27-33(41)25-37(39,5)6)15-11-12-16-30(2)18-14-20-32(4)22-24-36(44)40(10)28-34(42)26-38(40,7)8/h11-24,33-34,41-42H,25-28H2,1-10H3/b12-11+,17-13+,18-14+,23-21+,24-22+,29-15+,30-16+,31-19+,32-20+/t33-,34-,39-,40-/m0/s1 Key: GVOIABOMXKDDGU-YUURSNASSA-N
- SMILES: C/C(=C\C=C\C=C(\C=C\C=C(\C=C\C(=O)[C@]1(C(C[C@@H](C1)O)(C)C)C)/C)/C)/C=C/C=C(/C=C/C(=O)[C@]2(C(C[C@@H](C2)O)(C)C)C)\C

Properties
Chemical formula	C_{40}H_{56}O_{4}
Molar mass	600.884 g·mol^{−1}
Melting point	201 °C (394 °F; 474 K)
- Except where otherwise noted, data are given for materials in their standard state (at 25 °C [77 °F], 100 kPa). Infobox references

Capsorubin is a natural red dye of the xanthophyll class. As a food coloring, it has the E number E160c(ii). Capsorubin is a carotenoid found in red bell pepper (Capsicum annuum) and a component of paprika oleoresin. Capsorubin is also found in some species of lily.
