= Pipeline vaccine =

Vaccine which is under development

Pipeline vaccine refers to vaccines which are under development. The World Health Organization's (WHO) Product Development for Vaccines Advisory Committee oversees the development of pipeline vaccines.

== Examples ==
The WHO updates a list of diseases for which vaccine development is in pipeline. As of July 2021, the pipeline vaccines for the following diseases are under development.

- Campylobacter jejuni
- Chagas Disease
- Chikungunya
- Enterotoxigenic Escherichia coli
- Enterovirus 71 (EV71)
- Group B Streptococcus (GBS)
- Herpes Simplex Virus
- HIV-1
- Human Hookworm Disease
- Leishmaniasis
- Malaria
- Neisseria gonorrhoeae
- Nipah virus infection
- Nontyphoidal Salmonella Disease
- Norovirus
- Paratyphoid fever
- Respiratory Syncytial Virus (RSV)
- Schistosomiasis
- Shigella
- Staphylococcus aureus
- Streptococcus pneumoniae
- Streptococcus pyogenes
- Tuberculosis
- Universal influenza vaccine
