= ADAPT Act =

The Antibiotic Development to Advance Patient Treatment (ADAPT) Act (H.R. 3742) was introduced in the U.S. Congress on December 12, 2013 by Representative Phil Gingrey of Georgia and fifty-two cosponsors. Responding to the lack of financial incentives for drug manufacturers to innovate new antibiotics and antifungals and the regulatory barriers to their doing so, it proposed an expedited pathway for testing drugs intended for diseases for which no cure yet existed. After it died in committee, a similar version of the Act was re-introduced by Representative John Shimkus of Illinois and his cosponsor Representative Gene Green of Texas. Though this Act likewise failed to make it out of committee, several of its provisions were codified in the 21st Century Cures Act, which was signed into law on December 13, 2016. These include the expedited testing pathway for new antibiotics and a similar provision for antimicrobial susceptibility tests.

== Background ==
=== Antibiotic resistance and the barriers to new treatments ===
The cost of antibiotic resistance, in dollars and in lives, motivated the Act’s sponsors and the community stakeholders that supported its passage. In September 2014, the Subcommittee on Health of the House Committee on Energy and Commerce held a hearing at which officials from the Food and Drug Administration (FDA), Pew Charitable Trusts, and other organizations testified in favor of the ADAPT and 21st Century Cures Acts. Opening the hearing, Subcommittee Chairman Joseph R. Pitts (R-PA) quoted then-Prime Minister David Cameron’s recent admonition that failure to “confront the threat of antibiotic resistance” could “cast [humanity] back into the dark ages.” Speaking at this same hearing, Representative Phil Gingrey (R-GA) (the 2013 Act’s principal sponsor) referenced Centers for Disease Control (CDC) statistics, which placed the number of Americans who die from drug-resistant infections each year at around 23,000. Representative Gingrey asserted that the financial losses from such infections amount to $55 billion annually. Representative John Shimkus (R-IL) would later note these same figures in a House debate over the Acts in July 2015.

Equally worrisome to the ADAPT Act’s proponents were the economic and regulatory impediments to developing new treatments for drug-resistant illnesses. Citing the FDA, Representative Gingrey lamented during the 2014 hearing that “new antibiotic approval ha[d] decreased by 70 percent since the mid 1980s.” Representative Michael C. Burgess (R-TX) likewise took issue with the “lack of a pipeline of new drugs” to respond to the threat of super bugs. Several blamed inadequate market incentives for this paucity of remedies. As Dr. Barbara E. Murray, then-President of the Infectious Diseases Society of America, observed, “Antibiotics are typically priced low [and] used for a short duration.” Pharmaceutical companies can reap greater returns in other areas of research; hence, the development of new antibiotics flounders.

Compounding the scant financial motives for drug development, creators of new treatments were made to contend with "serious regulatory barriers". Dr. Murray observed that the small number of patients infected by novel diseases made it difficult for manufacturers to find enough test subjects in order to comply with federal agencies’ n-count requirements. The unavailability of diagnostic tests for these new infectious agents also demanded a large investment to find eligible study participants, while generating little information about drug effectiveness. Stagnant innovation becomes self-perpetuating. The more antibiotics to which a pathogen becomes resistant, the fewer controls there are against which to measure an experimental treatment.

=== The GAIN Act ===
In 2012, one of Congress’s earliest attempts at rectifying these barriers to new drug-resistant antibiotics came in the form of the Generating Antibiotics Now (GAIN) Act. GAIN was passed as an amendment to the Federal Food, Drug, and Cosmetic (FD&C) Act. Its strategy for generating new antibiotics is to offer manufacturers an artificial monopoly on any qualifying drugs that they produce. Such drugs must treat illnesses with “the potential to pose a serious threat to the public health.” However, beyond this blanket criterion, GAIN gave significant deference to the Secretary of the Department of Health and Human Services (the Secretary). This latitude was subject only to the requirements that she consider a given pathogen’s “impact on public health” and “morbidity and mortality rates” and consult with the CDC, FDA, and the medical community. Manufacturers who satisfied GAIN’s conditions were guaranteed five years of market exclusivity over the pertinent drug. These years could stack with the drug’s “five year exclusivity as a new chemical entity (NCE), three year clinical investigation exclusivity, and seven-year orphan drug exclusivity.” Moreover, any qualifying drugs were eligible for fast-track review.

GAIN’s value proposition proved to be an effective one. As Representative Frank Pallone (D-NJ) commented during the 2014 ADAPT Act hearing, within two years, GAIN had led to FDA approval of numerous new antibiotics. The expedited review procedure further ensured that these drugs would be “able to combat an imminent infectious disease threat and reach patients at an accelerated pace". At the same time, Representative Pallone and others were concerned about the consumer harms that these decades of exclusivity might yield. Representative Henry A. Waxman (D-CA) warned that exclusivity “allow[s drug companies] to charge higher prices,” which “imposes a significant burden on patients and on the healthcare system overall.” To justify “the carrot of marketing and regulatory exclusivities,” Representative Pallone exhorted his fellow members of Congress to ensure that their efforts “achieve[] the necessary impact on the pipeline of new drugs.”

== Provisions ==
=== Purpose and Scope ===
The ADAPT Act complemented GAIN. Representative Gingrey introduced it to the House as the “logical next step to the GAIN Act.” To that end, it did not merely render the development of new treatments more lucrative but more feasible as well. The centerpiece of this proposal was ADAPT’s creation of a Limited Population Antibacterial Drug (LPAD) approval pathway for certain antibiotics. Faced with a disease of sufficient severity for which alternatives do not yet exist, ADAPT would empower the Secretary to dispense with the usual testing requirements and allow manufacturers to go to market based on more limited efficacy tests. As Allan Coukell, Director of Drug, Medical Device, and Food Programs at the Pew Charitable Trusts, observed, a patient with multi-drug-resistant pneumonia will likely die without access to a new antibiotic. In that case, the uncertainty of an unproven remedy was preferable to the near certainty of death. In conducting such a risk-benefit assessment, ADAPT allowed the FDA to “accept less data” in approving a lifesaving drug. As Representative Shimkus later commended, this “new, streamlined pathway” saved “thousands of lives” by making experimental drugs available to those who would otherwise have no cure.

Given the uncertainty inherent in drugs approved via LPAD, ADAPT’s advocates were careful to constrain its reach to “high-need populations” suffering from the gravest threats. Dr. Janet Woodcock, Director of the FDA Center for Drug Evaluation and Research, claimed that ADAPT would be restricted to “rare resistant organisms where there are really very few treatment options available.” Within the population of patients affected by these diseases, the Act’s application would be further constrained to “the limited population in most need of the therapy, as opposed to all patients.” As such, ADAPT would not lower the federal review standard for new drugs, but merely contour it to the needs of “a specific population that is different from the general population.”

=== Relationship Between the 2013 and 2015 Acts ===
The two versions of the ADAPT Act—H.R. 3742 (2013) and H.R. 2629 (2015)—contain the same three overriding provisions discussed above. Both would amend Section 505 of FD&C (21 U.S.C. § 355) to formally include the expedited testing pathway. Each prescribes certain labeling requirements for manufacturers and charges the Secretary of Health and Human Services with conducting the aforementioned breakpoint review. Under a modification to Title III of the Public Health Service Act (42 U.S.C. § 247b-22), the Secretary is also to monitor “the use of antibacterial and antifungal drugs” as well as “[c]hanges in bacterial and fungal resistance to drugs.” This new responsibility of the Secretary encompasses drugs approved both through LPAD as well as the standard procedure. The results of the Secretary’s resistance analysis, like the breakpoint research, are to be made public.

The 2013 and 2015 Acts differed slightly in scope and the precise process they envisioned. Under the 2013 Act, the Secretary could approve drugs to treat “a limited population of patients for which there is an unmet need,” based on her assessment of either traditional comprehensive studies, “datasets of limited size,” “such other confirmatory evidence as [she] deems necessary,” or some combination of the above. The 2015 version expands this list of sources of proof, holding that the Secretary may consult nonclinical tests—assessments not conducted on humans—in deciding on whether to approve a drug.

At the same time, this later version limited the Act’s applicability via a purpose statement with language evocative of a sliding scale. The Act serves to “help expedite the development and availability of treatments for serious or life-threatening bacterial or fungal infections,” but this goal depends on “the severity of the infection and the availability or lack of alternative treatments.” Furthermore, the 2015 Act contained a new precondition. In this version of the legislation, the Secretary did not simply decide what level of proof would be necessary for a drug’s approval but actively collaborated with the manufacturer to create a “written agreement” that stipulated the necessary evidence. Only if such an agreement is reached may the Secretary approve the drug via the LPAD pathway. To the end of reaching this agreement, the 2015 Act provides for consultative meetings between manufacturers and the Secretary.

In regard to labeling, the 2013 Act would have mandated that LPAD drugs bear the warning label noted above: “This drug is indicated for use in a limited and specific population of patients.” However, on its terms, this requirement applied only to the drug’s “prescribing information”—not necessarily to its packaging or bottle. The 2015 Act broadened the labeling provision. In addition to the warning on prescriptions, this version entailed placing a label on the product itself that states “Limited Population” and features “in a prominent manner . . . adjacent to . . . the brand name of the product.”

Finally, the 2015 version of the Act expanded its applicability relative to the prior version. For one, it allowed the Secretary to expand LPAD to new arenas outside its original superbug context. Should she determine “that the public health would benefit from expansion of the limited-use pathway,” other medical areas may be subsumed within the Act’s expedited provisions. Secondly, it pulls antimicrobial susceptibility tests into the LPAD pathway. So long as a given test satisfies the exigency conditions for antimicrobial drug treatments, “the Secretary may authorize the marketing of such device” under LPAD—subject to cautionary labeling requirements.

=== Limitations ===
Kevin Khachatryan noted, that the ADAPT Act did not impose responsibilities for Antimicrobial stewardship for antibiotics developed under this pathway.” Coupled with the incentive for manufacturers to produce all that they can during their monopoly window, “[t]his can lead to overuse of these antibiotics and contribute to resistant microbes.” Additionally, the Act placed a premium of speed while sidelining other objectives of testing, namely diverse representation among test subjects. This could impede the gathering of data about certain populations respond to experimental drugs, namely “women, children, and [the] elderly.”

== Incorporation into the 21st Century Cures Act ==
The day Representative Gingrey and fifty-two cosponsors introduced the ADAPT Act, it was referred to the Subcommittee on Health. It never left. A little over a year later, Representative Shimkus, joined by cosponsor Gene Green (D-TX), resuscitated the Act. Again, it died in committee. Nevertheless, “[m]any of [its] provisions were ultimately incorporated into the 21st Century Cures Act [Cures Act]." A bipartisan effort ranging from such varied policy areas as Medicare savings to tick-borne diseases, the Cures Act was signed into law three years and a day after the ADAPT Act’s initial proposal.

Section 3042 (concerning the “expedited testing of new antibacterial and antifungal drugs”) of the Cures Act derives nearly verbatim from the 2015 ADAPT Act. At the request of a drug manufacturer, the Secretary may approve a given medication based on substandard data—provided that it “is intended to treat a serious or life-threatening infection in a limited population of patients with unmet needs.” However, in the vein of the 2015 ADAPT Act’s purpose statement, Section 3042 requires the Secretary to balance the benefits of expedited remedies against their costs. Drugs approved under the Cures Act’s LPAD pathway are subject to much the same labeling requirements as under the ADAPT Act. All labeling and advertising associated with such medications “shall contain the statement ‘Limited Population’ in a prominent manner and adjacent to . . . the proprietary name of such drug.” Section 3044 underscores the Secretary’s ability to update and issue new susceptibility criteria for antimicrobial drugs and her requirement make this information public. Finally, Section 3043 includes similar language (relative to the 2015 ADAPT Act) in regard to the expedited production of new ASTs and their labeling requirements.
