= Vincenzo Tiberio =

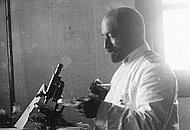
- Born: May 1, 1869; Sepino, Italy
- Died: January 7, 1915 (aged 45); Naples, Italy

Vincenzo Tiberio (May 1, 1869 – January 7, 1915) was an Italian researcher and medical officer of the Medical Corps of the Italian Navy and physician at the University of Naples. Observing that people complained of intestinal disorders after the walls of a well which supplied drinking water was cleaned off, he published a little noticed 1895 paper on the bactericidal effect of some molds, 35 years before Alexander Fleming's discovery of penicillin.

== Early life and education ==
Vincenzo Tiberio was born in Sepino (Molise, province of Campobasso) on May 1, 1869. His father, Domenicantonio, was a notary; his mother, Filomena Guacci, came from an upper-middle-class family. He had one brother, Sebastiano. When Vincenz was only seven years old (1876) his mother died and his father married Rosa Palladino di Guardiaregia. Vincenzo attended primary and secondary school in Sepino, but attended the secondary school final exam in Campobasso in the academic year 1883–1884. He attended high school and graduated in 1888–1889. He went on to study at the Medicine and Surgery University of Naples. During his university years he stayed at his father's sister place in Arzano, a crucial place where he started to notice a singular phenomenon which initiate his interest in molds. In the fourth year of university he started to go regularly to the Institute for Hygiene, directed by the professor Eugenio Fazio, who was studying the vital competition of bacteria. In 1892 he became an internal student of the institute, and started to learn bacteriological and chemical laboratory methods. He graduated in 1893 and immediately applied to the Health Officials at the Institute of Hygiene.

== Professional career ==
After finishing his degree in 1893 he enrolled in the public Hygiene course. In 1894 he received the post of ordinary assistant in the institute of Patologia Speciale Medica Dimostrativa, where he contributed by working three days a week in a public clinic, also organizing the scientific journal La Riforma Medica. During this period, which lasted almost a year, he reviewed over one hundred and eighty works.

Before the end of 1894 Tiberius made a drastic choice in participating and winning the competition for medical officer of the navy abandoning his university career. According to his dairies, all his pride emerged from the uniform he wore, for belonging to the navy and for life on board ships and for the Italian flag. Another reason that can not be ruled out for taking this decision to join the navy was the lack of reaction from the scientific community to his second and most innovative publication in his institute on the power of bacteriostatic and bactericidal power of molds "Potere batteriostatico e battericida delle muffe".

He started his service on January 1, 1896, with the rank of second class doctor, on January 10 he was assigned to the 3rd department. His first mission was in crete. Later on he was assigned to work in chania (small town in crete island) and stayed there from April 11, 1896, to January 7, 1897, and yet again from September 10, 1897, to October 22, 1898. In December 1898 he was assigned to the Sant'Anna navy hospital in Venice in the surgery and medicine department.

On December 6, 1900, he embarked for Zanzibar where an epidemic of smallpox, malaria and other tropical diseases such as yaws, elephantiasis, filariasis and sleeping sickness had broken out, and the ship was forced to remain anchored for nine months. The mission ended in 1902, and Tiberius returned to Italy.

After this period he was promoted to first class medical officer, and was on duty at the Maddalena department hospital where he remained until 1903.

In 1907 he began his specialization at the Institute of Hygiene of the Neapolitan University.

From April to December 1912 he was sent to Maddalena, where he took over the management of the Cabinet of Bacteriology of the Maritime Military Hospital.

From January 1913 to January 1914 he was Director of the Infirmary of the naval base of Tobruk in Libya, and director of the related Scientific Cabinet.

He returned to Italy in January 1914, where he was appointed director of “Gabinetto di Batteriologia e Igiene dell’Ospedale Militare Marittimo di Venezia” in Venice and, immediately after, he was transferred to become the director of “Gabinetto di Igiene e Batteriologia dell’Ospedale della Marina a Piedigrotta in Napoli” in Napoli.

On January 7, 1915, he became ill and died from myocardial infarction at the age of 45 years old.

== Work on mold ==
When Tiberio attended the faculty of medicine and surgery in Naples, he moved to Arzano in the house of his aunt. In the courtyard of the house there was a well used to supply water. Because of the humidity, molds grew on the well's walls and periodical cleaning of the well was performed. Tiberio noticed that, when the well was cleaned off, the inhabitants of the house had enteritis; if molds were allowed growing, no cases of enteritis were registered. He hypothesized about the relationship between the absence of molds and the growth of pathogenic bacteria in the intestine.

Regarding the steps of the research done by Tiberio he first collected samples from the well and observed them under the microscope. He identified three species of molds: Aspergillus flavescens, Penicillium glaucum, and Mucor mucedo.

He then prepared an aqueous extract of the individual fungi and studied their action on some bacteria. The results of the research enabled him to observe that. In the cellular substance of the molds he examined, some water-soluble principles, provided with bactericidal action, were contained. It was the first true antibiotic activity demonstrated in vitro, which Tiberius confirmed through in vivo experimentation, both on guinea pigs and rabbits. The research done by Vincenzo Tiberio was a complete scientific cycle of experiments. Starting from observation, the proving of the initial hypothesis, and also the preparation of the antibiotic substance to show its effect in vitro and in vivo. He also managed to evaluate the effective doses and time of the antibiotic efficacy. In 1895 he published the results of his experiments in an Italian medical journal, but the work was disregarded as coincidence and received no further study.

== Writings and reviews ==
- "Esame chimico, macroscopico e batterioscopico di due farine lattee italiane." Vincenzo Tiberio, Annali dell'Istituto d'Igiene sperimentale della R. Università di Roma, 1893.
- "Sugli estratti di alcune muffe." Vincenzo Tiberio, Annali di Igiene sperimentale, 1895, volume 5, pp. 91–103.
- "Varietà e cura dell'angina pectoris", Vincenzo Tiberio, reviewed in Riforma Medica 298, 1894, a. X, N. 286
- "Indicazione alla colecistectomia", Vincenzo Tiberio, reviewed in Riforma Medica, 1895, a. XI, N. 27.
- "Notizie sul colera", Vincenzo Tiberio, reviewed in Riforma Medica, 1895, a. XI, N. 39
- "La batterioterapia nella tubercolosi", Vincenzo Tiberio, reviewed in Riforma Medica, 1895, a.XI, N. 131.
- "Cura delle complicazioni nei feriti e negli operati", Vincenzo Tiberio, reviewed in Riforma Medica, 1895, a.XI, N. 145.
- "Sugli impulsi irresistibile degli epilettici", Vincenzo Tiberio, reviewed in Riforma Medica, 1895, a.XI, N. 146.
- "Sulla cura radicale della ipertrofia prostatica", Vincenzo Tiberio, reviewed in Riforma Medica, July 1, 1895, a.XI, N. 151.
- "Sulla tossiterapia dei tumori maligni", Vincenzo Tiberio, reviewed in Riforma Medica, July 3, 1895, a.XI, N. 153.
- "Sul parassitismo dei tumori maligni", Vincenzo Tiberio, reviewed in Riforma Medica, July 8, 1895, a.XI, N. 157.
- "Sulle angine pseudo difteriche", Vincenzo Tiberio, reviewed in Riforma Medica, July 26, 1895, a.XI, N. 173 .

== Bibliography ==
- Perciaccante A, Coralli A, Lippi D, Appenzeller O, Bianucci R. Vincenzo Tiberio (1869-1915) and the dawn of the antibiotic age. Internal and Emergency Medicine, Springer, June 1 2019.
- Tamburello M, Villone J. Vincenzo Tiberio: La prima antibiotico-terapia sperimentale in vivo. Medicina nei secoli arte e scienza. Journal of History of Medicine, March 18 2006; pp. 965-992.
- Antonio di Chiro, "Vincenzo Tiberio Precursore Della Scoperta Della Penicillina." Glocale. Molisana, 2017, pp. 243-251.
