= Capsanthin =

Names
- IUPAC name (3R,3′S,5′R)-3,3′-Dihydroxy-β,κ-caroten-6′-one
- Systematic IUPAC name (2E,4E,6E,8E,10E,12E,14E,16E,18E)-19-[(4R)-4-Hydroxy-2,6,6-trimethylcyclohex-1-en-1-yl]-1-[(1R,4S)-4-hydroxy-1,2,2-trimethylcyclopentyl]-4,8,13,17-tetramethylnonadeca-2,4,6,8,10,12,14,16,18-nonaen-1-one

Identifiers
| CAS Number | 465-42-9 |
| 3D model (JSmol) | Interactive image |
| Beilstein Reference | 2493991 |
| ChEBI | CHEBI:3375 |
| ChEMBL | ChEMBL1519371 |
| ChemSpider | 4444640 |
| ECHA InfoCard | 100.006.696 |
| EC Number | 207-364-1 |
| E number | E160c(i) (colours) |
| KEGG | C08584 |
| PubChem CID | 5281228 |
| UNII | 420NY1J57N |
| CompTox Dashboard (EPA) | DTXSID10905012 |
- InChI: InChI=1S/C40H56O3/c1-29(17-13-19-31(3)21-23-36-33(5)25-34(41)26-38(36,6)7)15-11-12-16-30(2)18-14-20-32(4)22-24-37(43)40(10)28-35(42)27-39(40,8)9/h11-24,34-35,41-42H,25-28H2,1-10H3/b12-11+,17-13+,18-14+,23-21+,24-22+,29-15+,30-16+,31-19+,32-20+/t34-,35+,40+/m1/s1 Key: VYIRVAXUEZSDNC-RDJLEWNRSA-N
- SMILES: CC1=C(C(C[C@@H](C1)O)(C)C)/C=C/C(=C/C=C/C(=C/C=C/C=C(\C)/C=C/C=C(\C)/C=C/C(=O)[C@@]2(C[C@H](CC2(C)C)O)C)/C)/C

Properties
| Chemical formula | C_{40}H_{56}O_{3} |
| Molar mass | 584.885 g·mol^{−1} |
| Appearance | Deep red solid |
| Melting point | 181–182 °C (358–360 °F; 454–455 K) |
- Except where otherwise noted, data are given for materials in their standard state (at 25 °C [77 °F], 100 kPa). Infobox references

Capsanthin is a natural red dye of the xanthophyll class of carotenoids. As a food coloring, it has the E number E160c(i). Capsanthin is the main carotenoid in the Capsicum annuum species of plants including red bell pepper, New Mexico chile, and cayenne peppers (Capsicum annuum) and a component of paprika oleoresin. Capsanthin is also found in some species of lily.

Capsanthin has antioxidant capacity in vitro due to the presence of eleven conjugated double bonds, a conjugated keto group, and a cyclopentane ring.
