= Peptidoglycan recognition protein =

Protein family

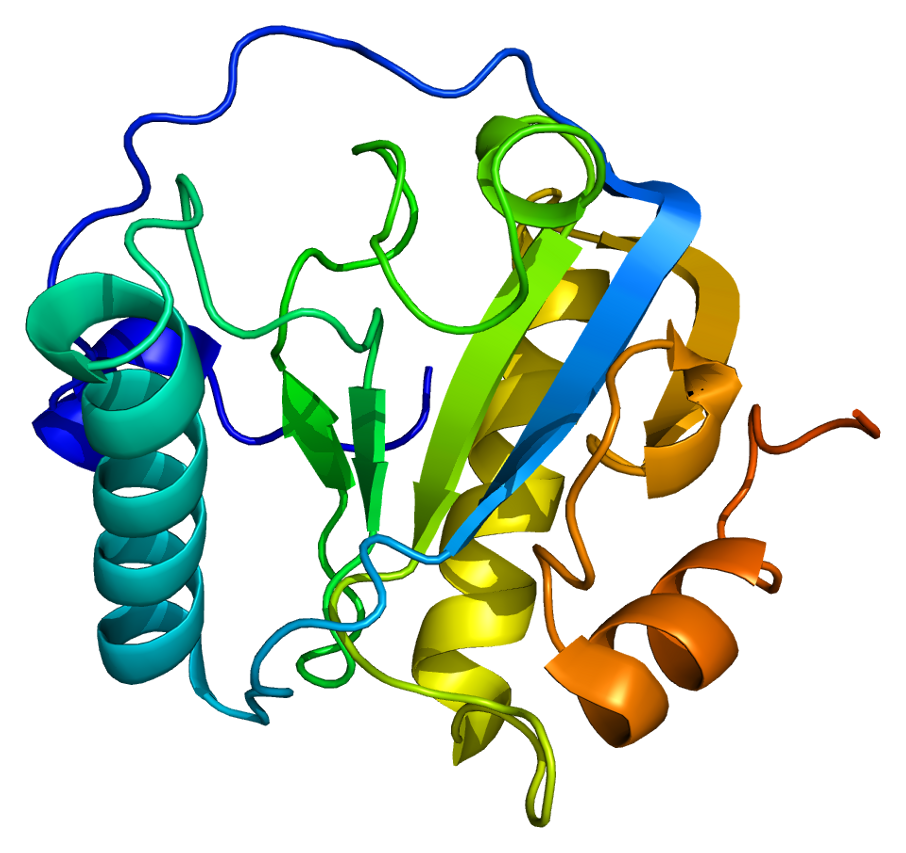
Structure of human PGLYRP1 protein. Based on PyMOL rendering of PDB 1yck.

Peptidoglycan recognition proteins (PGRPs) are a group of highly conserved pattern recognition receptors with at least one peptidoglycan recognition domain capable of recognizing the peptidoglycan component of the cell wall of bacteria. They are present in insects, mollusks, echinoderms and chordates. The mechanism of action of PGRPs varies between taxa. In insects, PGRPs kill bacteria indirectly by activating one of four unique effector pathways: prophenoloxidase cascade, Toll pathway, IMD pathway, and induction of phagocytosis. In mammals, PGRPs either kill bacteria directly by interacting with their cell wall or outer membrane, or hydrolyze peptidoglycan. They also modulate inflammation and microbiome and interact with host receptors.

== Discovery ==
The first PGRP was discovered in 1996 by Masaaki Ashida and coworkers, who purified a 19 kDa protein present in the hemolymph and cuticle of a silkworm (Bombyx mori), and named it Peptidoglycan Recognition Protein, because it specifically bound peptidoglycan and activated the prophenoloxidase cascade. In 1998 Håkan Steiner and coworkers, using a differential display screen, identified and cloned a PGRP ortholog in a moth (Trichoplusia ni) and then discovered and cloned mouse and human PGRP orthologs, thus showing that PGRPs are highly conserved from insects to mammals. Also in 1998, Sergei Kiselev and coworkers independently discovered and cloned a protein from a mouse adenocarcinoma with the same sequence as PGRP, which they named Tag7. In 1999 Masanori Ochiai and Masaaki Ashida cloned the silkworm (B. mori) PGRP.

In 2000, based on the available sequence of the fruit fly (Drosophila melanogaster) genome, Dan Hultmark and coworkers discovered a family of 12 highly diversified PGRP genes in Drosophila, which they classified into short (S) and long (L) forms based on the size of their transcripts. By homology searches of available sequences, they also predicted the presence of a long form of human and mouse PGRP (PGRP-L).

In 2001, Roman Dziarski and coworkers discovered and cloned three human PGRPs, named PGRP-L, PGRP-Iα, and PGRP-Iβ (for long and intermediate size transcripts). They established that human genome codes for a family of 4 PGRPs: PGRP-S (short PGRP) and PGRP-L, PGRP-Iα, and PGRP-Iβ. Subsequently, the Human Genome Organization Gene Nomenclature Committee changed the gene symbols of PGRP-S, PGRP-L, PGRP-Iα, and PGRP-Iβ to PGLYRP1, PGLYRP2, PGLYRP3, and PGLYRP4, respectively, and this nomenclature is currently also used for other mammalian PGRPs. Sergei Kiselev and coworkers also independently cloned mouse PGLYRP2 (TagL). Thereafter, PGRPs have been identified throughout the animal kingdom, although lower metazoa (e.g., the nematode Caenorhabditis elegans) and plants do not have PGRPs.

In 2003, Byung-Ha Oh and coworkers crystalized PGRP-LB from Drosophila and solved its structure.

== Types ==
Insects generate up to 19 alternatively spliced PGRPs, classified into long (L) and short (S) forms. For instance, the fruit fly (D. melanogaster) has 13 PGRP genes, whose transcripts are alternatively spliced into 19 proteins, while the mosquito (Anopheles gambiae) has 7 PGRP genes, with 9 splice variants.

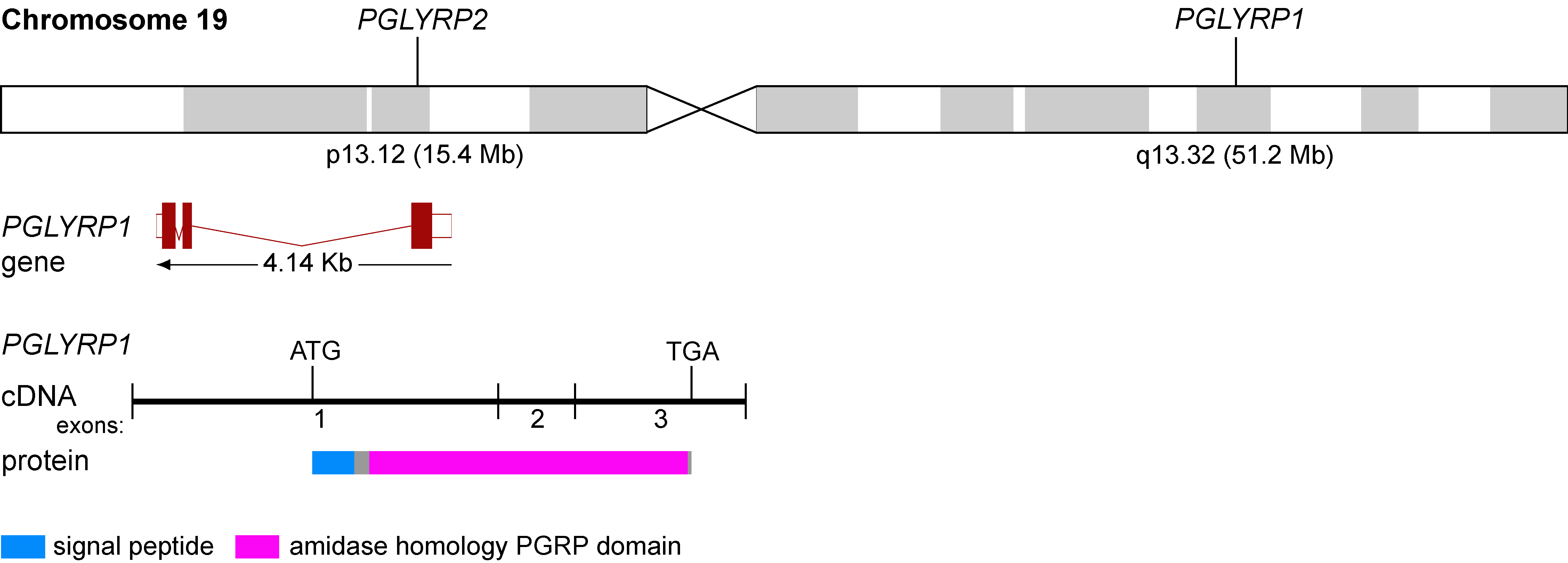
Location of human PGLYRP1 gene on chromosome 19 and schematic gene, cDNA, and protein structures with exons, introns, and protein domains indicated.

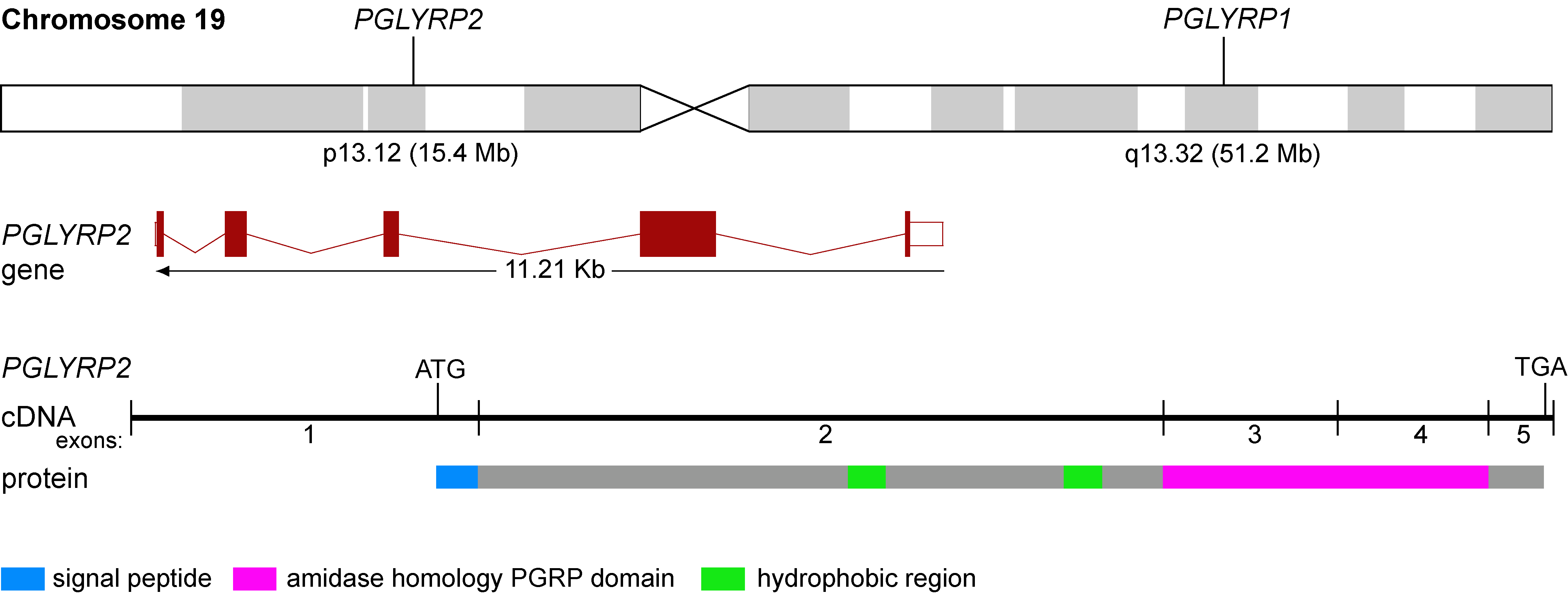
Location of human PGLYRP2 gene on chromosome 19 and schematic gene, cDNA, and protein structures with exons, introns, and protein domains indicated.

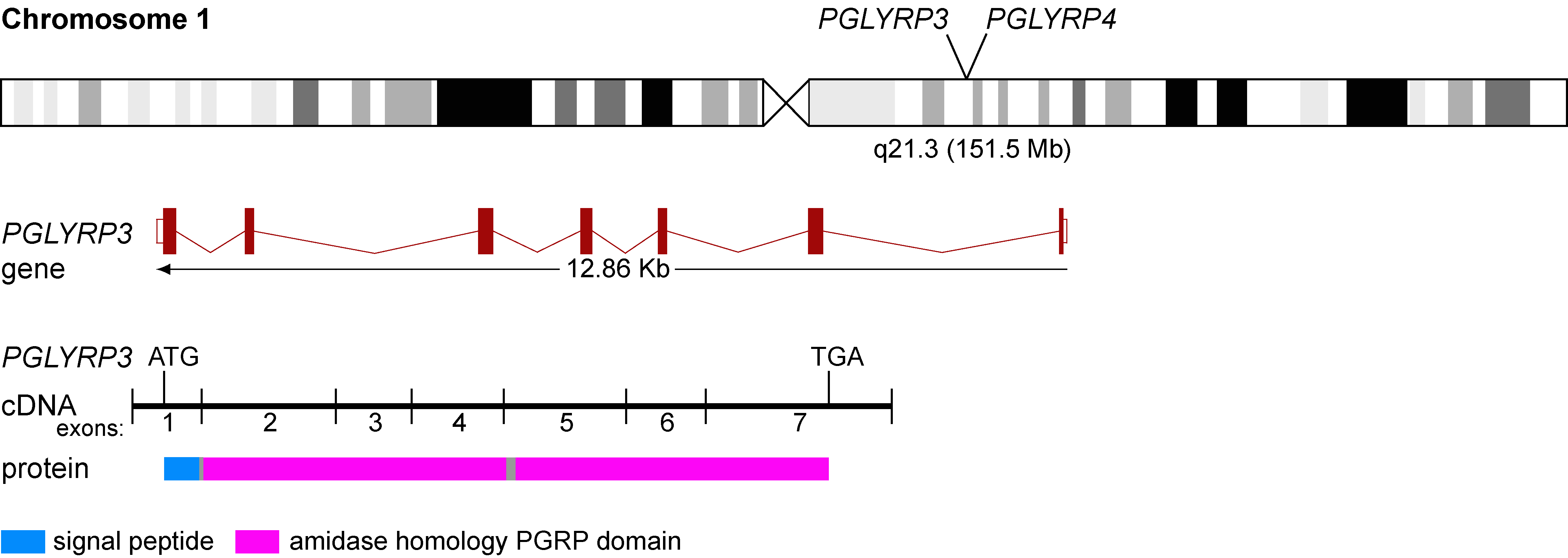
Location of human PGLYRP3 gene on chromosome 1 and schematic gene, cDNA, and protein structures with exons, introns, and protein domains indicated.

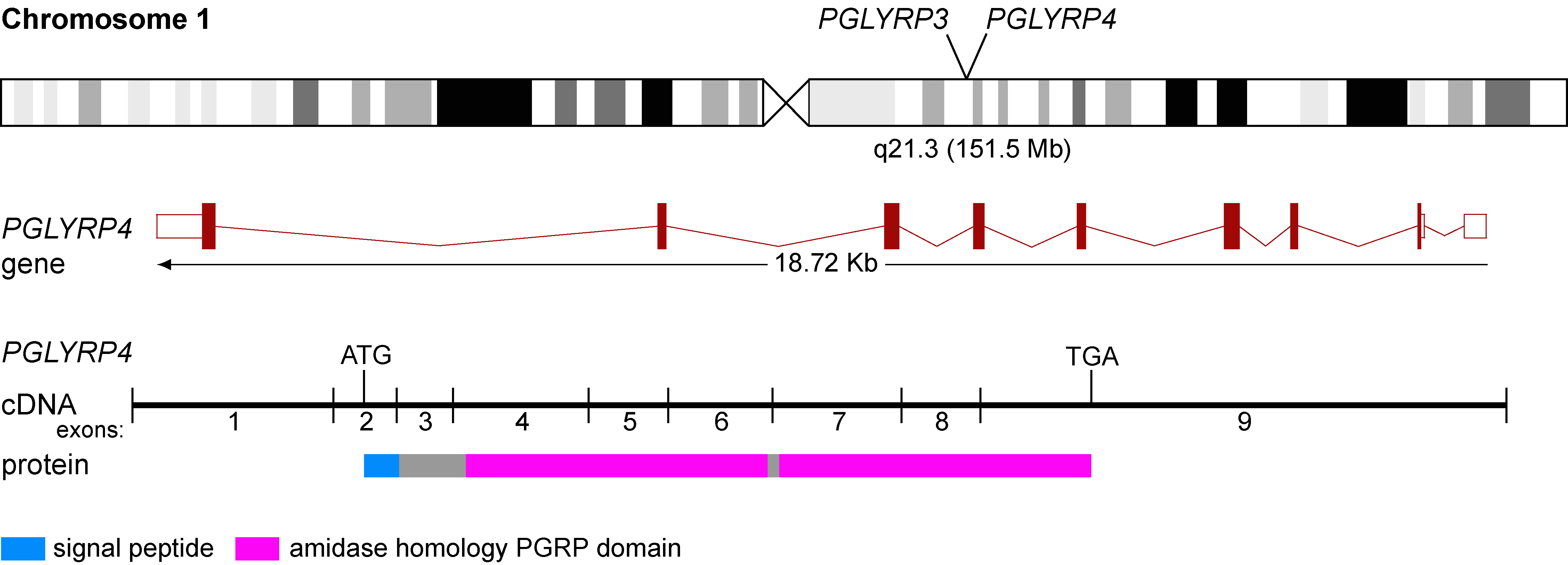
Location of human PGLYRP4 gene on chromosome 1 and schematic gene, cDNA, and protein structures with exons, introns, and protein domains indicated.

Mammals have up to four PGRPs, all of which are secreted. These are peptidoglycan recognition protein 1 (PGLYRP1), peptidoglycan recognition protein 2 (PGLYRP2), peptidoglycan recognition protein 3 (PGLYRP3) and peptidoglycan recognition protein 4 (PGLYRP4).

== Structure ==
PGRPs contain at least one C-terminal peptidoglycan recognition domain (PGRP domain), which is about 165 amino acids long. This peptidoglycan-binding type 2 amidase domain is homologous to bacteriophage and bacterial type 2 amidases.

PGRP domain has three peripheral α-helices and several central β-strands that form a peptidoglycan-binding groove on the front face of the molecule, whereas the back of the molecule has a PGRP-specific segment, which is often hydrophobic, diverse among various PGRPs, and not present in bacteriophage amidases.

Invertebrate PGRPs can be small secreted proteins (e.g., PGRP-SB, -SA, -SD, and -LB in Drosophila), larger transmembrane proteins (e.g., PGRP-LA, -LC, and -LF in Drosophila), or intracellular proteins (e.g., PGRP-LEfl in Drosophila). They usually have one C-terminal PGRP domain, with few exceptions, such as Drosophila PGRP-LF, which has two PGRP domains. Mammalian PGRPs are secreted proteins that typically form dimers and contain either one PGRP domain (e.g., human PGLYRP1 and PGLYRP2) or two PGRP domains (e.g., human PGLYRP3 and PGLYRP4).

== Functions ==
=== Peptidoglycan binding ===
PGRPs bind peptidoglycan, the main component of bacterial cell wall. Peptidoglycan is a polymer of β(1-4)-linked N-acetylglucosamine (GlcNAc) and N-acetylmuramic acid (MurNAc) cross-linked by short peptides composed of alternating L- and D-amino acids. MurNAc-tripeptide is the minimum fragment of peptidoglycan that binds to PGRPs and MurNAc-tetrtapeptides and MurNAc-pentapeptides bind with higher affinity. Peptidoglycan binding usually induces a change in the structure of PGRP or interaction with another PGRP molecule that locks MurNAc-peptide in the binding grove. Some PGRPs can discriminate between different amino acids present in the peptide part of peptidoglycan, especially between the amino acid in the third position of peptidoglycan peptide, which is usually L-lysine in Gram-positive cocci or meso-diaminopimelic acid (m-DAP) in Gram-negative bacteria and Gram-positive bacilli. Some PGRPs can also discriminate between MurNAc and its anhydro form.

=== Functions in insects ===
PGRPs are the main sensors of bacteria in insects and the main components of their antimicrobial defenses. PGRPs activate signaling cascades that induce production of antimicrobial peptides and other immune effectors. Soluble PGRPs (e.g. PGRP-SA and PGRP-SD in Drosophila) detect L-lysine-containing peptidoglycan and activate a proteolytic cascade that generates an endogenous ligand Spätzle that activates cell-surface Toll-1 receptor. Toll-1 in turn triggers a signal transduction cascade that results in production of antimicrobial peptides primarily active against Gram-positive bacteria and fungi.

Transmembrane PGRPs (e.g., Drosophila PGRP-LC) and intracellular PGRPs (e.g., Drosophila PGRP-LE) function as receptors – they detect m-DAP-containing peptidoglycan and activate IMD (immunodeficiency) signal transduction pathway that induces production of antimicrobial peptides active primarily against Gram-negative bacteria. This activation of IMD pathway also induces production of dual oxidase, which generates antimicrobial reactive oxygen species.

Some insect PGRPs (e.g., Drosophila PGRP-SA and -LE, and B. mori PGRP-S) activate the prophenoloxidase cascade, which results in the formation of melanin, reactive oxygen species, and other antimicrobial compounds.

Several small insect PGRPs (e.g., Drosophila PGRP-SB, -SC, and -LB) are peptidoglycan hydrolases (N-acetylmuramoyl-L-alanine amidases) that hydrolyzes the amide bond between the MurNAc and L-Ala (the first amino acid in the stem peptide). These amidases act as peptidoglycan scavengers because they render the resulting peptidoglycan fragments unable to bind to PGRP. They abolish cell-activating capacity of peptidoglycan and limit systemic uptake of peptidoglycan from the bacteria-laden intestinal tract and down-regulate or prevent over-activation of host defense pathways. Some of these amidases are also directly bactericidal, which further defends the host against infections and helps to control the numbers of commensal bacteria.

Some other insect PGRPs (e.g., Drosophila PGRP-LF) do not bind peptidoglycan and lack intracellular signaling domain – they complex with PGRP-LC and function to down-regulate activation of the IMD pathway.

=== Functions in other invertebrates ===
PGRPs are present and constitutively expressed or induced by bacteria in most invertebrates, including worms, snails, oysters, scallops, squid, and starfish. These PGRPs are confirmed or predicted amidases and some have antibacterial activity. They likely defend the hosts against infections or regulate colonization by certain commensal bacteria, such as Vibrio fischeri in the light organ of Hawaiian bobtail squid, Euprymna scolopes.

=== Expression and functions in lower vertebrates ===
Early fish-like chordates, amphioxi (lancelets), have extensive innate immune system (but no adaptive immunity) and have multiple PGRP genes – e.g., 18 PGRP genes in the Florida lancelet (Branchiostoma floridae), all of which are predicted peptidoglycan-hydrolyzing amidases and at least one is bactericidal.

Fish, such as zebrafish (Danio rerio), typically have 4 PGRP genes, but they are not all orthologous to mammalian PGLYRPs and different species may have multiple PGRP splice variants. They are constitutively expressed in many tissues of adult fish, such as liver, gills, intestine, pancreas, spleen, and skin, and bacteria can increase their expression. PGRPs are also highly expressed in developing oocytes and in eggs (e.g., zebrafish PGLYRP2 and PGLYRP5). These PGRPs have both peptidoglycan-hydrolyzing amidase activity and are directly bactericidal to both Gram-positive and Gram-negative bacteria and protect eggs and developing embryos from bacterial infections. They may also regulate several signaling pathways.

Amphibian PGRPs are also proven or predicted amidases and likely have similar functions to fish PGRPs.

=== Expression in mammals ===
All four mammalian PGRPs are secreted proteins.

PGLYRP1 (peptidoglycan recognition protein 1) has the highest level of expression of all mammalian PGRPs. PGLYRP1 is highly constitutively expressed in the bone marrow and in the granules of neutrophils and eosinophils, and also in activated macrophages, lactating mammary gland, and intestinal Peyer's patches' microfold (M) cells, and to a much lesser extent in epithelial cells in the eye, mouth, respiratory and intestinal tracts, and brain's microglia.

PGLYRP2 (peptidoglycan recognition protein 2) is constitutively expressed in the liver, from where it is secreted into the blood. Liver PGLYRP2 and earlier identified serum N-acetylmuramoyl-L-alanine amidase are the same protein encoded by the PGLYRP2 gene. Bacteria and cytokines induce low level of PGLYRP2 expression in the skin and gastrointestinal epithelial cells, intestinal intraepithelial T lymphocytes, dendritic cells, NK (natural killer) cells, and inflammatory macrophages. Some mammals, e.g. pigs, express multiple splice forms of PGLYRP2 with differential expression.

PGLYRP3 (peptidoglycan recognition protein 3) and PGLYRP4 (peptidoglycan recognition protein 4) are constitutively expressed in the skin, in the eye, and in mucous membranes in the tongue, throat, and esophagus, and at a much lower level in the remaining parts of the intestinal tract. PGLYRP4 is also expressed in the salivary glands and mucus-secreting glands in the throat. Bacteria and their products increase expression of PGLYRP3 and PGLYRP4 in keratinocytes and oral epithelial cells. When expressed in the same cells, PGLYRP3 and PGLYRP4 form disulfide-linked heterodimers.

Mouse PGLYRP1, PGLYRP2, PGLYRP3, and PGLYRP4 are also differentially expressed in the developing brain and this expression is influenced by the intestinal microbiome. Expression of PGLYRP1 is also induced in rat brain by sleep deprivation and in mouse brain by ischemia.

=== Functions in mammals ===
Human PGLYRP1, PGLYRP3, and PGLYRP4 are directly bactericidal for both Gram-positive and Gram-negative bacteria and a spirochete Borrelia burgdorferi. Mouse and bovine PGLYRP1 also have antibacterial activity, and bovine PGLYRP1 has also antifungal activity. These human PGRPs kill bacteria by simultaneously inducing three synergistic stress responses: oxidative stress, thiol stress, and metal stress. Bacterial killing by these PGRPs does not involve cell membrane permeabilization, cell wall hydrolysis, or osmotic shock, but is synergistic with lysozyme and antibacterial peptides.

Human, mouse, and porcine PGLYRP2 are enzymes, N-acetylmuramoyl-L-alanine amidases, that hydrolyze the amide bond between the MurNAc and L-alanine, the first amino acid in the stem peptide in bacterial cell wall peptidoglycan. The minimal peptidoglycan fragment hydrolyzed by PGLYRP2 is MurNAc-tripeptide. Hydrolysis of peptidoglycan by PGLYRP2 diminishes its pro-inflammatory activity.

Unlike invertebrate and lower vertebrate PGRPs, mammalian PGRPs have only limited role in defense against infections. Intranasal application of PGLYRP3 or PGLYRP4 in mice protects from intranasal lung infection with Staphylococcus aureus and Escherichia coli, and intravenous administration of PGLYRP1 protects mice from systemic Listeria monocytogenes infection. Also, PGLYRP1-deficient mice are more sensitive to systemic infections with non-pathogenic bacteria (Micrococcus luteus and Bacillus subtilis) and to Pseudomonas aeruginosa-induced keratitis, but not to systemic infections with several pathogenic bacteria (S. aureus and E. coli). However, PGLYRP1 protects mice against B. burgdorferi infection, as mice lacking PGLYRP1 have increased spirochete burden in the heart and joints, but not in the skin, indicating the role for PGLYRP1 in controlling dissemination of B. burgdorferi during the systemic phase of infection. PGLYRP2-deficient mice are more sensitive to P. aeruginosa-induced keratitis and Streptococcus pneumoniae-induced pneumonia and sepsis, and PGLYRP4-deficient mice are more sensitive to S. pneumoniae-induced pneumonia.

Human and mouse PGLYRP2 promote hepatitis B virus (HBV) clearance in hepatocytes by binding to covalently closed circular DNA (cccDNA) of HBV, sequestering it in the nucleus, and separating it from the cellular viral replication machinery. Additionally, PGLYRP2 suppresses HBV capsid assembly by directly interacting with the viral capsid and promoting secretion of the PGLYRP2-HBV capsid complexes.

Mouse PGRPs play a role in maintaining healthy microbiome, as PGLYRP1-, PGLYRP2-, PGLYRP3-, and PGLYRP4-deficient mice have significant changes in the composition of their intestinal microbiomes and PGLYRP1-deficient mice also have changes in their lung microbiome.

Mouse PGRPs also play a role in maintaining anti- and pro-inflammatory homeostasis in the intestine, skin, lungs, joints, and brain. All four PGLYRPs protect mice from dextran sodium sulfate (DSS)-induced colitis and the effect of PGLYRP2 and PGLYRP3 on the intestinal microbiome is responsible for this protection. PGLYRP3 is anti-inflammatory in intestinal epithelial cells. PGLYRP4 has anti-inflammatory effect in a mouse model of S. pneumoniae pneumonia and sepsis, which also depends on the PGLYRP4-controlled microbiome.

PGLYRP3 and PGLYRP4 are anti-inflammatory and protect mice from atopic dermatitis and PGLYRP4 also protects mice from Bordetella pertussis-induced airway inflammation. PGLYRP2 is anti-inflammatory and protects mice from experimentally-induced psoriasis-like inflammation and Salmonella enterica-induced intestinal inflammation. But PGLYRP2 has also pro-inflammatory effects, as it promotes the development of experimental arthritis, bacterially-induced keratitis, and inflammation in S. pneumoniae lung infection in mice. PGLYRP2 also regulates motor activity and anxiety-dependent behavior in mice.

PGLYRP1 is pro-inflammatory and promotes experimentally-induced asthma, skin inflammation, and experimental autoimmune encephalomyelitis (EAE), neuroinflammation, and tumor formation and metastasis in mice. The pro-inflammatory effect in asthma depends on the PGLYRP1-regulated intestinal microbiome, whereas in EAE, it depends on the expression of PGLYRP1 in monocytes, macrophages, and neutrophils. PGLYRP1 also has anti-inflammatory effects, as it inhibits the activation of cytotoxic anti-tumor CD8^{+} T cells and its deletion leads to decreased tumor growth in mice. Mice lacking PGLYRP1 infected with B. burgdorferi show signs of immune dysregulation, which results in Th1 cytokine response and impairment of antibody response to B. burgdorferi. PGLYRP1 also promotes wound healing in experimentally-induced keratitis in mice.

Some mammalian PGRPs can also function as host receptor agonists or antagonists. Human PGLYRP1 complexed with peptidoglycan or multimerized binds to and stimulates TREM-1 (triggering receptor expressed on myeloid cells-1), a receptor present on neutrophils, monocytes and macrophages that induces production of pro-inflammatory cytokines.

In mouse macrophages, intracellular PGLYRP1 complexes with its ligand (N-acetylglucosamine N-acetylmuramic tripeptide) and with NOD2 (nucleotide-binding oligomerization domain-containing protein 2) and GEF-H1 (guanine nucleotide exchange factor). This initiates signaling cascade that results in expression of immune regulators that protect tissues, such as intestinal mucosa, from excessive inflammation.

Human and mouse PGLYRP1 (Tag7) bind heat shock protein 70 (Hsp70) in solution and PGLYRP1-Hsp70 complexes are also secreted by cytotoxic lymphocytes, and these complexes are cytotoxic for tumor cells. This cytotoxicity is antagonized by metastasin (S100A4) and heat shock-binding protein HspBP1. PGLYRP1-Hsp70 complexes bind to the TNFR1 (tumor necrosis factor receptor-1, which is a death receptor) and induce a cytotoxic effect via apoptosis and necroptosis. This cytotoxicity is associated with permeabilization of lysosomes and mitochondria. By contrast, free PGLYRP1 acts as a TNFR1 antagonist by binding to TNFR1 and inhibiting its activation by PGLYRP1-Hsp70 complexes. Some peptides from human PGLYRP1 potentiate and some inhibit the cytotoxic effects of TNF-α and PGLYRP1-Hsp70 complexes and inhibit cytokine production in human peripheral blood mononuclear cells. The inhibitory peptides also decrease inflammatory responses in a mouse model of acute lung injury and in the complete Freund's adjuvant-induced arthritis in mice.

== Medical relevance ==
Genetic PGLYRP variants or changed expression of PGRPs are associated with several diseases. Patients with inflammatory bowel disease (IBD), which includes Crohn's disease and ulcerative colitis, have significantly more frequent missense variants in all four PGLYRP genes than healthy controls. These results suggest that PGRPs protect humans from these inflammatory diseases, and that mutations in PGLYRP genes are among the genetic factors predisposing to these diseases. PGLYRP1 variants are also associated with increased fetal hemoglobin in sickle cell disease, PGLYRP2 variants are associated with esophageal squamous cell carcinoma, PGLYRP2, PGLYRP3, and PGLYRP4 variants are associated with Parkinson's disease, PGLYRP3 and PGLYRP4 variants are associated with psoriasis and composition of airway microbiome, and PGLYRP4 variants are associated with ovarian cancer.

Several diseases are associated with increased expression of PGLYRP1, including: atherosclerosis, myocardial infarction, heart failure, coronary artery disease, sepsis, pulmonary fibrosis, asthma, chronic kidney disease, rheumatoid arthritis, multiple sclerosis, chronic traumatic encephalopathy, posterior scleritis, gingival inflammation, caries, osteoarthritis, cardiovascular events and death in kidney transplant patients, ulcerative colitis and Crohn's disease, alopecia, type I diabetes, pancreatic ductal adenocarcinoma, lung adenocarcinoma, doxorubicin-induced cardiotoxicity in breast cancer, infectious complications in hemodialysis, and thrombosis, consistent with pro-inflammatory effects of PGLYRP1. Lower expression of PGLYRP1 was found in endometriosis. Umbilical cord blood serum concentration of PGLYRP1 is inversely associated with pediatric asthma and pulmonary function in adolescence.

Increased serum PGLYRP2 levels are present in patients with systemic lupus erythematosus (and correlate with disease activity index, renal damage, and abnormal lipid profile), chronic HBV infection, myocardial infarction, and coronary artery disease (and correlate with increased risk of myocardial infarction). Autoantibodies to PGLYRP2 are significantly increased in patients with rheumatoid arthritis. Decreased expression of PGLYRP2 is found in HIV-associated and drug-sensitive tuberculosis, Lyme disease, hepatocellular carcinoma, and polyarteritis nodosa.

== Applications ==
A silkworm larvae plasma (SLP) test to detect peptidoglycan, based on activation of the prophenoloxidase cascade by PGRP in the hemolymph of the silkworm, Bombyx mori, is available.

== See also ==
- Peptidoglycan recognition protein 1
- Peptidoglycan recognition protein 2
- Peptidoglycan recognition protein 3
- Peptidoglycan recognition protein 4
- Peptidoglycan
- Innate immune system
- Bacterial cell walls
