= Peptidoglycan recognition protein 1 =

Protein-coding gene in the species Homo sapiens

PGLYRP1
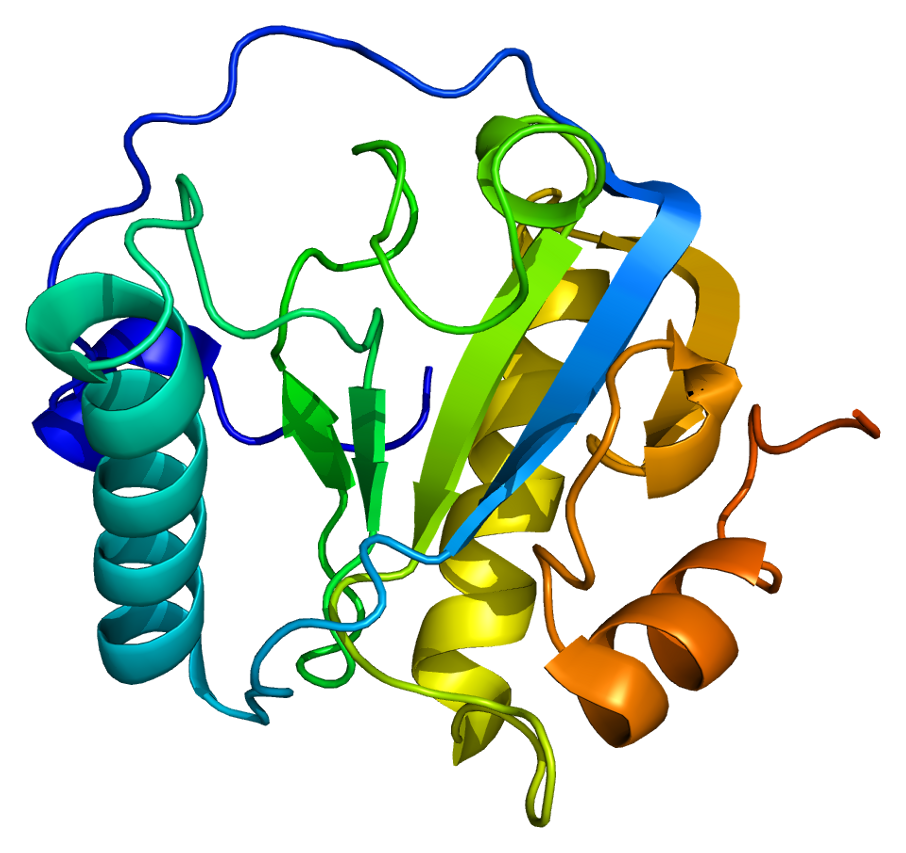

Identifiers
- Aliases: PGLYRP1, PGLYRP, PGRP, PGRP-S, PGRPS, TAG7, TNFSF3L, peptidoglycan recognition protein 1
- External IDs: OMIM: 604963; MGI: 1345092; GeneCards: PGLYRP1
Available structures
PDB	Ortholog search: PDBe RCSB
PDB	List of PDB id codes 1YCK

Gene location (Human)
Chr.	Chromosome 19 (human)
Band	19q13.32	Start	46,019,153 bp
Band	19q13.32	End	46,023,053 bp

Gene location (Mouse)
Chr.	Chromosome 7 (mouse)
Band	7|7 A3	Start	18,605,256 bp
Band	7|7 A3	End	18,624,384 bp
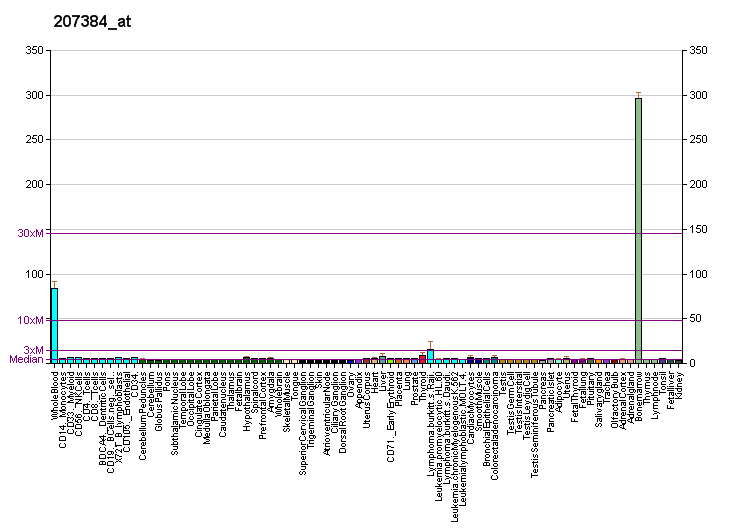
RNA expression pattern
Bgee	Human / Mouse (ortholog); Top expressed in: bone marrow; bone marrow cell; trabecular bone; blood; granulocyte; spleen; monocyte; right lung; upper lobe of left lung; right lobe of liver / Top expressed in: granulocyte; crypt of lieberkuhn of small intestine; tibiofemoral joint; corneal stroma; left colon; submandibular gland; conjunctival fornix; duodenum; ileum; trachea; More reference expression data
BioGPS	More reference expression data
Gene ontology
Molecular function	zinc ion binding; peptidoglycan immune receptor activity; N-acetylmuramoyl-L-alanine amidase activity; peptidoglycan binding
Cellular component	extracellular exosome; extracellular region; specific granule lumen; phagocytic vesicle lumen; tertiary granule lumen; extracellular space
Biological process	peptidoglycan catabolic process; negative regulation of natural killer cell differentiation involved in immune response; negative regulation of interferon-gamma production; innate immune response; negative regulation of inflammatory response; defense response to bacterium; immune response; detection of bacterium; immune system process; defense response to Gram-positive bacterium; pattern recognition receptor signaling pathway; antimicrobial humoral response; neutrophil degranulation; positive regulation of cytolysis in other organism; antimicrobial humoral immune response mediated by antimicrobial peptide; response to bacterium; killing of cells of other organism
Sources:Amigo / QuickGO
Orthologs
Databases	NCBI: entry; OMA: entry
Species	Human	Mouse
Entrez	8993	21946
Ensembl	ENSG00000008438	ENSMUSG00000030413
UniProt	O75594	O88593
RefSeq (mRNA)	NM_005091	NM_009402
RefSeq (protein)	NP_005082	NP_033428
Location (UCSC)	Chr 19: 46.02 – 46.02 Mb	Chr 7: 18.61 – 18.62 Mb
PubMed search
- Wikidata
View/Edit Human	View/Edit Mouse

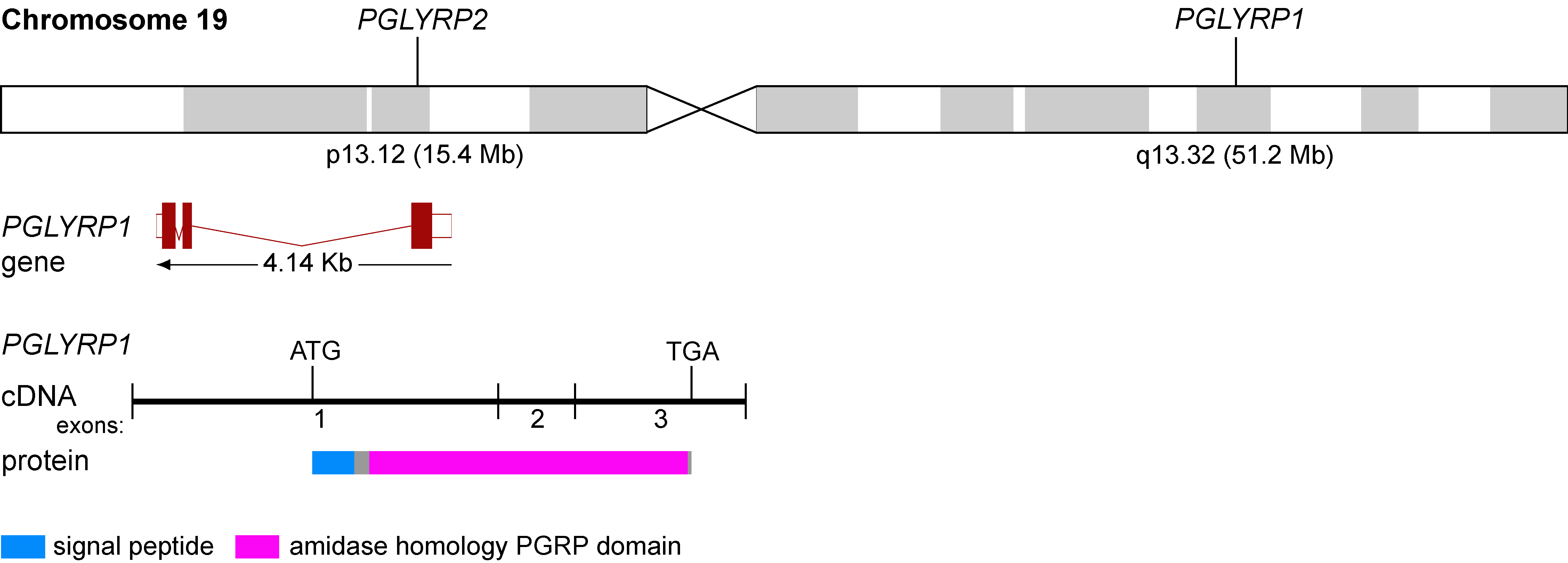
Location of human PGLYRP1 gene on chromosome 19 and schematic gene, cDNA, and protein structures with exons, introns, and protein domains indicated.

Peptidoglycan recognition protein 1, PGLYRP1, also known as TAG7, is an antibacterial and pro-inflammatory innate immunity protein that in humans is encoded by the PGLYRP1 gene.

== Discovery ==
PGLYRP1 was discovered independently by two laboratories in 1998. Håkan Steiner and coworkers, using a differential display screen, identified and cloned Peptidoglycan Recognition Protein (PGRP) in a moth (Trichoplusia ni) and based on this sequence discovered and cloned mouse and human PGRP orthologs. Sergei Kiselev and coworkers discovered and cloned a protein from a mouse adenocarcinoma with the same sequence as mouse PGRP, which they named Tag7. Human PGRP was a founding member of a family of four PGRP genes found in humans that were named PGRP-S, PGRP-L, PGRP-Iα, and PGRP-Iβ (for short, long, and intermediate size transcripts, by analogy to insect PGRPs). Their gene symbols were subsequently changed to PGLYRP1 (peptidoglycan recognition protein 1), PGLYRP2 (peptidoglycan recognition protein 2), PGLYRP3 (peptidoglycan recognition protein 3), and PGLYRP4 (peptidoglycan recognition protein 4), respectively, by the Human Genome Organization Gene Nomenclature Committee, and this nomenclature is currently also used for other mammalian PGRPs. In 2005, Roy Mariuzza and coworkers crystallized human PGLYRP1 and solved its structure.

== Tissue distribution and secretion ==
PGLYRP1 has the highest level of expression of all mammalian PGRPs. PGLYRP1 is highly constitutively expressed in the bone marrow and in the tertiary granules of polymorphonuclear leukocytes (neutrophils and eosinophils), and to a lesser extent in activated macrophages and fetal liver. In macrophages, PGLYRP1 is expressed in the endoplasmic reticulum and Golgi apparatus. PGLYRP1 is also expressed in lactating mammary gland, and to a much lower level in corneal epithelium in the eye, in the inflamed skin, spleen, thymus, and in epithelial cells in the respiratory and intestinal tracts. PGLYRP1 is prominently expressed in intestinal Peyer's patches in microfold (M) cells and is also one of the markers for differentiation of T helper 17 (Th17) cells into T regulatory (Treg) cells in mice. PGLYRP1 expression in T cells is increased by IL-27. Mouse PGLYRP1 is expressed in the developing brain and this expression is influenced by the intestinal microbiome. PGLYRP1 expression is increased in the brain's microglia both in patients and mice with neuroinflammation. Expression of PGLYRP1 in rat brain is induced by sleep deprivation and in mouse brain by ischemia. In pancreatic tissue, PGLYRP1 is expressed during inflammation in acinar cells and, into a higher extent, in malignant transformation in a subpopulation of tumor cells identified as cancer stem cells.

Human PGLYRP1 is also found in the serum after release from leukocyte granules by exocytosis. PGLYRP1 is present in camel's milk at 120 μg/mL and in polymorphonuclear leukocytes' granules at 2.9 mg/10^{9} cells.

== Structure ==
As with most PGRPs, PGLYRP1 has one carboxy-terminal peptidoglycan-binding type 2 amidase domain (also known as a PGRP domain), which, however, does not have amidase enzymatic activity. This PGRP domain consists of three alpha helices, five beta strands and coils, and an N-terminal segment (residues 1–30, the PGRP-specific segment), whose structure varies substantially among PGRPs. PGLYRP1 has three pairs of conserved cysteines, which form three disulfide bonds at positions 9 and 133, 25 and 70, and 46 and 52 in human PGLYRP1. The Cys46–Cys52 disulfide is broadly conserved in invertebrate and vertebrate PRGPs, Cys9–Cys133 disulfide is conserved in all mammalian PGRPs, and Cys25–Cys70 disulfide is unique to mammalian PGLYRP1, PGLYRP3, and PGLYRP4, but not found in amidase-active PGLYRP2. Human PGLYRP1 has a 25 Å-long peptidoglycan-binding cleft whose walls are formed by two α-helices and the floor by a β-sheet.

Human PGLYRP1 is secreted and forms disulfide-linked homodimers. The structure of the disulfide-linked dimer is unknown, as the crystal structure of only monomeric human PGLYRP1 was solved, because the crystallized protein lacked the 8 N-terminal amino acids, including Cys8, which is likely involved in the formation of the disulfide-linked dimer. Rat PGLYRP1 is also likely to form disulfide-linked dimers as it contains Cys in the same position as Cys8 in human PGLYRP1, whereas mouse and bovine PGLYRP1 do not contain this Cys and likely do not form disulfide-linked dimers.

Camel PGLYRP1 can form two non-disulfide-linked dimers: the first with peptidoglycan-binding sites of two participating molecules fully exposed at the opposite ends of the dimer, and the second with peptidoglycan-binding sites buried at the interface and the opposite sides exposed at the ends of the dimer. This arrangement is unique for camel PGLYRP1.

PGLYRP1 is glycosylated and glycosylation is required for its bactericidal activity.

== Functions ==
The PGLYRP1 protein plays an important role in the innate immune response and inflammation.

=== Peptidoglycan binding ===
PGLYRP1 binds peptidoglycan, a polymer of β(1-4)-linked N-acetylglucosamine (GlcNAc) and N-acetylmuramic acid (MurNAc) cross-linked by short peptides, the main component of bacterial cell wall. Human PGLYRP1 binds GlcNAc-MurNAc-tripeptide with high affinity (Kd = 5.5 × 10^{−8} M) and MurNAc-tripeptide, MurNAc-tetrapeptide, and MurNAc-pentapeptide with Kd = 0.9-3.3 × 10^{−7} M with a preference for meso-diaminopimelic acid (m-DAP) over L-lysine-containing peptidoglycan fragments. m-DAP is present in the third position of peptidoglycan peptide in Gram-negative bacteria and Gram-positive bacilli, whereas L-lysine is in this position in peptidoglycan peptide in Gram-positive cocci. Smaller peptidoglycan fragments do not bind or bind with much lower affinity. PGLYRP1 also binds to peptidoglycan with ornithine in the third position of peptidoglycan peptide found in a spirochete, Borrelia burgdorferi.

Camel PGLYRP1 binds MurNAc-dipeptide with low affinity (Kd = 10^{−7} M) and it also binds bacterial lipopolysaccharide with Kd = 1.6 × 10^{−9} M and lipoteichoic acid with Kd = 2.4 × 10^{−8} M at binding sites outside the canonical peptidoglycan-binding cleft with the ligands and PGLYRP1 forming tetramers. Such tetramers are unique to camel PGLYRP1 and are not found in human PGLYRP1 because of stearic hindrance.

=== Bactericidal activity ===
Human PGLYRP1 is directly bactericidal for both Gram-positive (Bacillus subtilis, Bacillus licheniformis, Lactobacillus acidophilus, Staphylococcus aureus, Streptococcus pyogenes) and Gram-negative (Escherichia coli, Proteus vulgaris, Salmonella enterica, Shigella sonnei, Pseudomonas aeruginosa) bacteria, and a spirochete Borrelia burgdorferi. PGLYRP1 limits intracellular survival of Listeria monocytogenes in macrophages and is also active against Chlamydia trachomatis. Mouse and bovine PGLYRP1 have antibacterial activity against Bacillus megaterium, Staphylococcus hemolyticus, S. aureus, E. coli, and S. enterica, and bovine PGLYRP1 also has antifungal activity against Cryptococcus neoformans.

In Gram-positive bacteria, human PGLYRP1 binds to the separation sites of the newly formed daughter cells, created by bacterial peptidoglycan-lytic endopeptidases, LytE and LytF in B. subtilis, which separate the daughter cells after cell division. These cell-separating endopeptidases likely expose PGLYRP1-binding muramyl peptides, as shown by co-localization of PGLYRP1 and LytE and LytF at the cell-separation sites, and no binding of PGLYRP1 to other regions of the cell wall with highly cross-linked peptidoglycan. This localization is necessary for the bacterial killing, because mutants that lack LytE and LytF endopeptidases and do not separate after cell division, do not bind PGLYRP1, and are also not readily killed by PGLYRP1. In Gram-negative bacteria (E. coli), PGLYRP1 binds to the outer membrane. In both Gram-positive and Gram-negative bacteria PGLYRP1 stays bound to the cell envelope and does not enter the cytoplasm.

The mechanism of killing by PGLYRP1 is based on induction of lethal envelope stress and production of reactive oxygen species in bacteria and the subsequent shutdown of transcription and translation. PGLYRP1-induced bacterial killing does not involve cell membrane permeabilization, which is typical for defensins and other antimicrobial peptides, cell wall hydrolysis, or osmotic shock.

Human PGLYRP1 has synergistic bactericidal activity with lysozyme and antibacterial peptides. Streptococci produce a protein (SP1) that inhibits antibacterial activity of human PGLYRP1.

=== Defense against infections ===
PGLYRP1 plays a limited role in host defense against most infections. PGLYRP1-deficient mice are more sensitive to systemic infections with non-pathogenic bacteria (Micrococcus luteus and B. subtilis) and to P. aeruginosa-induced keratitis, but not to systemic infections with pathogenic bacteria (S. aureus and E. coli). Intravenous administration of PGLYRP1 protects mice from systemic Listeria monocytogenes infection.

PGLYRP1 also protects against B. burgdorferi infection, as mice lacking PGLYRP1 have increased spirochete burden in the heart and joints, but not in the skin, indicating the role for PGLYRP1 in controlling dissemination of B. burgdorferi during the systemic phase of infection.

=== Maintaining microbiome ===
Mouse PGLYRP1 plays a role in maintaining healthy microbiome, as PGLYRP1-deficient mice have significant changes in the composition of their intestinal and lung microbiomes, which affect their sensitivity to colitis and lung inflammation.

=== Effects on inflammation ===
Mouse PGLYRP1 plays a role in maintaining anti- and pro-inflammatory homeostasis in the intestine, skin, lungs, joints, lymphoid organs, eyes, and brain. PGLYRP1-deficient mice are more sensitive than wild type mice to dextran sodium sulfate (DSS)-induced colitis, as well as to trinitrobenzene sulfonic acid (TNBS)-induced colitis, which indicates that PGLYRP1 protects mice from both forms of experimentally induced colitis. Moreover, administration of the PGLYRP1 ligand, N-acetylglucosamine N-acetylmuramic tripeptide, attenuates TNBS-induced colitis in wild type, but not in PGLYRP1-deficient mice.

In a mouse model of arthritis PGLYRP1-deficient mice develop more severe arthritis than wild type mice. Also, mice deficient in both PGLYRP1 and PGLYRP2 develop more severe arthritis than PGLYRP2-deficient mice, which are resistant to arthritis. These results indicate that PGLYRP2 promotes arthritis and that PGLYRP1 counteracts the pro-inflammatory effect of PGLYRP2. PGLYRP1-deficient mice also have impaired corneal wound healing compared with wild type mice, which indicates that PGLYRP1 promotes corneal wound healing.

PGLYRP1-deficient mice are more resistant than wild type mice to experimentally induced allergic asthma, atopic dermatitis, contact dermatitis, and psoriasis-like skin inflammation. These results indicate that mouse PGLYRP1 promotes lung and skin inflammation. These pro-inflammatory effects are due to increased numbers and activity of T helper 17 (Th17) cells and decreased numbers of T regulatory (Treg) cells and in the case of asthma also increased numbers of T helper 2 (Th2) cells and decreased numbers of plasmacytoid dendritic cells. The pro-inflammatory effect of PGLYRP1 on asthma depends on the PGLYRP1-regulated intestinal microbiome, because this increased resistance to experimentally induced allergic asthma could be transferred to wild type germ-free mice by microbiome transplant from PGLYRP1-deficient mice.

PGLYRP1-deficient mice are also protected against experimental autoimmune encephalomyelitis (EAE) and PGLYRP1 contributes to EAE disease pathology. PGLYRP1 expression in monocytes/macrophages and neutrophils, but not in T cells, is required for optimal antigen presentation and priming of CD4^{+} T cells in pathogenesis of EAE. PGLYRP1 protein potentiates reactive gliosis, neuroinflammation, and consequent behavioral changes in mouse models of neuroinflammation and knock-down of PGLYRP1 expression or anti-PGLYRP1 antibodies attenuate EAE and other models of neuroinflammation.

However, PGLYRP1 has an opposite (i.e., inhibitory) function in T cells. PGLYRP1-deficient mice have enhanced anti-tumor immunity and decreased tumor growth. PGLYRP1 is co-expressed with inhibitory genes in CD8^{+} tumor-infiltrating T lymphocytes (TILs) with a signature of exhausted CD8^{+} T cells in both mice and humans, which makes these cells less effective in anti-tumor immunity. Thus, deleting PGLYRP1 in T cells allows enhanced anti-tumor immunity. TNFα-induced PGLYRP1 also promotes tumor formation and metastasis in mice by protecting cancer stem cells from immune clearance by myeloid-derived cells and activated T-cells.

Mice lacking PGLYRP1 infected with B. burgdorferi also show signs of immune dysregulation, including lower serum IgG levels and higher levels of proinflammatory cytokines and chemokines, IFNγ, CXCL9, and CXCL10. Thus, Pglyrp1 absence in these mice results in the Th1 cytokine response, while impairing antibody response to B. burgdorferi.

PGLYRP1 fused to the Fc region of mouse IgG2a increases survival and ameliorates lung injury and inflammation in a mouse model of E. coli-induced acute respiratory distress syndrome, without affecting bacterial clearance. This PGLYRP1-Fc construct suppresses macrophage activation through the Fc gamma receptor (FcγR)-dependent mechanism, thus reducing inflammatory damage to the lungs.

=== Cytotoxicity ===
Mouse PGLYRP1 (Tag7) was reported to be cytotoxic for tumor cells and to function as a Tumor Necrosis Factor-α (TNF-α)-like cytokine. Subsequent experiments revealed that PGLYRP1 (Tag7) by itself does not have cytotoxic activity, but that PGLYRP1 (Tag7) forms a complex with heat shock protein 70 (Hsp70) and that only these complexes are cytotoxic for tumor cells, whereas PGLYRP1 (Tag7) by itself acts as an antagonist of cytotoxicity of PGLYRP1-Hsp70 complexes. The complexes of PGLYRP1-derived peptide with metastasin or its peptide fragments are also cytotoxic to cancer cells that have TNFR1 receptors.

=== Interaction with host proteins and receptors ===
Human and mouse PGLYRP1 (Tag7) bind heat shock protein 70 (Hsp70) in solution and PGLYRP1-Hsp70 complexes are also secreted by cytotoxic lymphocytes, and these complexes are cytotoxic for tumor cells. This cytotoxicity is antagonized by metastasin (S100A4) and heat shock-binding protein HspBP1. However, complexes of metastasin with PGLYRP1-derived peptide (but not the entire PGLYRP1) are also cytotoxic to tumor cells. PGLYRP1-Hsp70 complexes and PGLYRP1 peptide-metastasin complexes bind to the TNFR1 (tumor necrosis factor receptor-1, which is a death receptor) and induce a cytotoxic effect via apoptosis and necroptosis. This cytotoxicity is associated with permeabilization of lysosomes and mitochondria. By contrast, free PGLYRP1 acts as a TNFR1 antagonist by binding to TNFR1 and inhibiting its activation by PGLYRP1-Hsp70 complexes. Some peptides from human PGLYRP1 potentiate and some inhibit the cytotoxic effects of TNF-α and PGLYRP1-Hsp70 complexes and inhibit cytokine production in human peripheral blood mononuclear cells. The inhibitory peptides also decrease inflammatory responses in a mouse model of acute lung injury and in the complete Freund's adjuvant-induced arthritis in mice.

Human PGLYRP1 complexed with peptidoglycan or multimerized binds to and stimulates TREM-1 (triggering receptor expressed on myeloid cells-1), a receptor present on neutrophils, monocytes and macrophages that induces production of pro-inflammatory cytokines.

In the endoplasmic reticulum and Golgi in mouse macrophages, intracellular PGLYRP1 complexes with its ligand (N-acetylglucosamine N-acetylmuramic tripeptide) and with NOD2 (nucleotide-binding oligomerization domain-containing protein 2) and GEF-H1 (guanine nucleotide exchange factor). This initiates signaling cascade that results in expression of immune regulators that protect tissues, such as intestinal mucosa, from excessive inflammation. In mouse brain and spinal cord PGLYRP1 is secreted by microglial cells and initiates the TREM-1–Syk–Erk1/2–Stat3 signaling pathway in glial cells, which leads to the production of proinflammatory mediators.

== Medical relevance ==
Genetic PGLYRP1 variants or changed expression of PGLYRP1 are often associated with various diseases. Patients with inflammatory bowel disease (IBD), which includes Crohn's disease and ulcerative colitis, have significantly more frequent missense variants in PGLYRP1 gene (and also in the other three PGLYRP genes) than healthy controls. These results suggest that PGLYRP1 protects humans from these inflammatory diseases, and that mutations in PGLYRP1 gene are among the genetic factors predisposing to these diseases. PGLYRP1 variants are also associated with increased fetal hemoglobin in sickle cell disease.

Several diseases are associated with increased expression of PGLYRP1, including: atherosclerosis, myocardial infarction, coronary artery disease, heart failure, sepsis, inflamed tissues in Crohn's disease and ulcerative colitis, pulmonary fibrosis, asthma, chronic kidney disease, rheumatoid arthritis, multiple sclerosis, chronic traumatic encephalopathy, posterior scleritis, gingival inflammation, caries, osteoarthritis, cardiovascular events and death in kidney transplant patients, alopecia, heart failure, type I diabetes, pancreatic ductal adenocarcinoma, lung adenocarcinoma, doxorubicin-induced cardiotoxicity in breast cancer, infectious complications in hemodialysis, and thrombosis, consistent with pro-inflammatory effects of PGLYRP1. Lower expression of PGLYRP1 was found in endometriosis. Umbilical cord blood serum concentration of PGLYRP1 is inversely associated with pediatric asthma and pulmonary function in adolescence.

== See also ==
- Peptidoglycan recognition protein
- Peptidoglycan recognition protein 2
- Peptidoglycan recognition protein 3
- Peptidoglycan recognition protein 4
- Peptidoglycan
- Innate immune system
- Bacterial cell walls
