= Peptidoglycan recognition protein 4 =

Protein found in humans

PGLYRP4

Identifiers
- Aliases: PGLYRP4, PGLYRPIbeta, PGRP-Ibeta, PGRPIB, SBBI67, peptidoglycan recognition protein 4
- External IDs: OMIM: 608198; MGI: 2686324; GeneCards: PGLYRP4
Available structures
| PDB | Ortholog search: PDBe RCSB |
| PDB | List of PDB id codes 2EAV, 2EAX |

Gene location (Human)
| Chr. | Chromosome 1 (human) |
| Band | 1q21.3 | Start | 153,330,120 bp |
| Band | 1q21.3 | End | 153,348,841 bp |

Gene location (Mouse)
| Chr. | Chromosome 3 (mouse) |
| Band | 3|3 F1 | Start | 90,634,213 bp |
| Band | 3|3 F1 | End | 90,648,824 bp |
RNA expression pattern
| Bgee | Human / Mouse (ortholog); Top expressed in: skin of abdomen; skin of leg; skin of thigh; cervix epithelium; tibialis anterior muscle; mucosa of ileum; pancreatic ductal cell; vagina; human penis; vulva / Top expressed in: esophagus; lip; granulocyte; zone of skin; spermatocyte; thymus; spermatid; testicle; spleen; stomach; More reference expression data |
| BioGPS | n/a |
Gene ontology
| Molecular function | zinc ion binding; N-acetylmuramoyl-L-alanine amidase activity; peptidoglycan immune receptor activity; peptidoglycan binding; protein heterodimerization activity |
| Cellular component | extracellular region; intracellular anatomical structure; membrane; protein-containing complex; extracellular space |
| Biological process | immune system process; innate immune response; defense response to bacterium; detection of bacterium; defense response to Gram-positive bacterium; peptidoglycan catabolic process; pattern recognition receptor signaling pathway; positive regulation of cytolysis in other organism; antimicrobial humoral immune response mediated by antimicrobial peptide; antimicrobial humoral response; killing of cells of other organism; negative regulation of interferon-gamma production; negative regulation of natural killer cell differentiation involved in immune response |
Sources:Amigo / QuickGO
Orthologs
| Databases | NCBI: entry; OMA: entry |
| Species | Human | Mouse |
| Entrez | 57115 | 384997 |
| Ensembl | ENSG00000163218 | ENSMUSG00000042250 |
| UniProt | Q96LB8 | Q0VB07 |
| RefSeq (mRNA) | NM_020393 | NM_001165968; NM_207263 |
| RefSeq (protein) | NP_065126 | NP_001159440; NP_997146 |
| Location (UCSC) | Chr 1: 153.33 – 153.35 Mb | Chr 3: 90.63 – 90.65 Mb |
| PubMed search |
- Wikidata
| View/Edit Human | View/Edit Mouse |

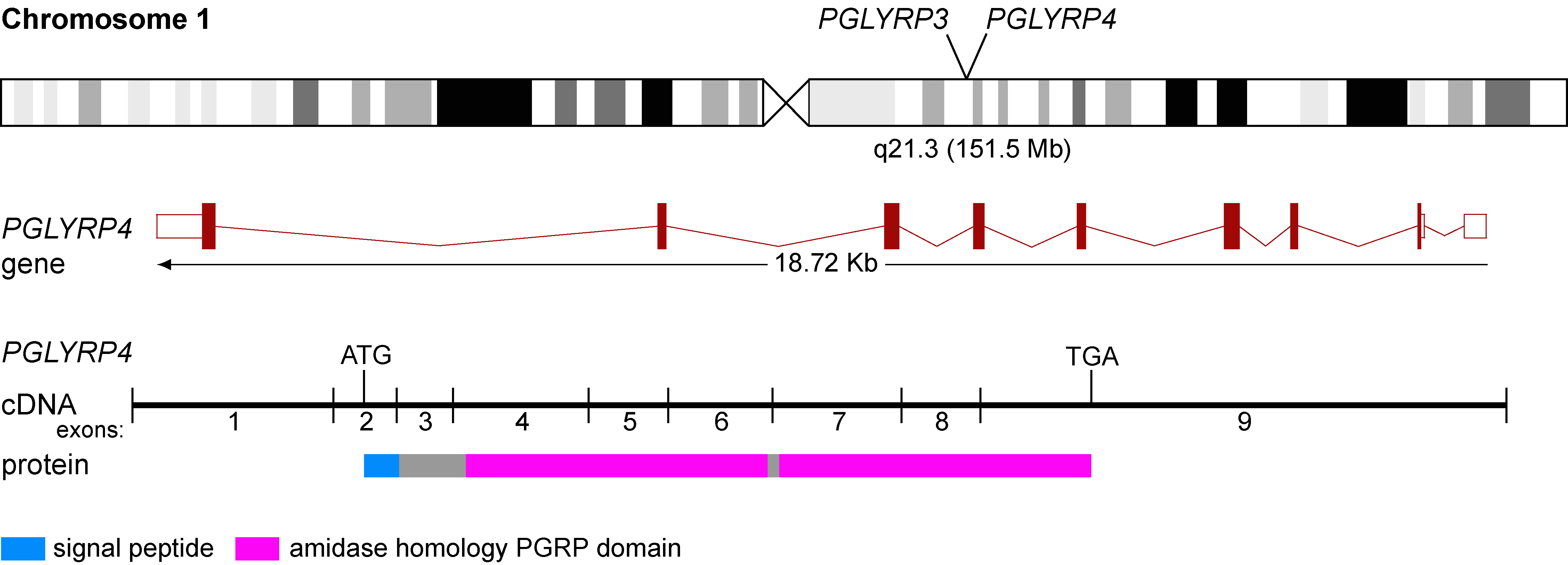
Location of human PGLYRP4 gene on chromosome 1 and schematic gene, cDNA, and protein structures with exons, introns, and protein domains indicated

Peptidoglycan recognition protein 4 (PGLYRP4, formerly PGRP-Iβ) is an antibacterial and anti-inflammatory innate immunity protein that in humans is encoded by the PGLYRP4 gene.

== Discovery ==
PGLYRP4 (formerly PGRP-Iβ), a member of a family of human Peptidoglycan Recognition Proteins (PGRPs), was discovered in 2001 by Roman Dziarski and coworkers who cloned and identified the genes for three human PGRPs, PGRP-L, PGRP-Iα, and PGRP-Iβ (named for long and intermediate size transcripts), and established that human genome codes for a family of 4 PGRPs: PGRP-S (short PGRP or PGRP-S) and PGRP-L, PGRP-Iα, and PGRP-Iβ. Subsequently, the Human Genome Organization Gene Nomenclature Committee changed the gene symbols of PGRP-S, PGRP-L, PGRP-Iα, and PGRP-Iβ to PGLYRP1 (peptidoglycan recognition protein 1), PGLYRP2 (peptidoglycan recognition protein 2), PGLYRP3 (peptidoglycan recognition protein 3), and PGLYRP4 (peptidoglycan recognition protein 4), respectively, and this nomenclature is currently also used for other mammalian PGRPs.

== Tissue distribution and secretion ==
PGLYRP4 has similar expression to PGLYRP3 (peptidoglycan recognition protein 3) but not identical. PGLYRP4 is constitutively expressed in the skin, in the eye, in the mucous membranes in the tongue, throat, and esophagus, in the salivary glands and mucus-secreting cells in the throat, and at a much lower level in the remaining parts of the intestinal tract. Bacteria and their products increase the expression of PGLYRP4 in keratinocytes and oral epithelial cells. Mouse PGLYRP4 is also differentially expressed in the developing brain and this expression is influenced by the intestinal microbiome. PGLYRP4 is secreted and forms disulfide-linked dimers.

== Structure ==
PGLYRP4, similar to PGLYRP3, has two peptidoglycan-binding type 2 amidase domains (also known as PGRP domains), which are not identical (have 34% amino acid identity in humans) and do not have amidase enzymatic activity. PGLYRP4 is secreted, it is glycosylated, and its glycosylation is required for its bactericidal activity. PGLYRP4 forms disulfide-linked homodimers, but when expressed in the same cells with PGLYRP3, it forms PGLYRP3:PGLYRP4 disulfide-linked heterodimers.

The C-terminal peptidoglycan-binding domain of human PGLYRP4 has been crystallized and its structure solved (in a free form and in a complex with peptidoglycan fragment, disaccharide-pentapeptide) and is similar to human PGLYRP1 and PGLYRP3. PGLYRP4 C-terminal PGRP domain contains central β-sheet composed of six β-strands surrounded by three α-helices and three short helices and N-terminal segment unique to PGRPs and not found in bacteriophage and prokaryotic amidases. PGLYRP4 C-terminal PGRP domain contains three disulfide bonds, one broadly conserved in invertebrate and vertebrate PRGPs, one conserved in all mammalian PGRPs, and one unique to mammalian PGLYRP1, PGLYRP3, and PGLYRP4, but not found in the amidase-active PGLYRP2. The structures of the entire PGLYRP4 molecule (with two PGRP domains) and of the disulfide-linked dimer are unknown.

== Functions ==
The PGLYRP4 protein plays an important role in the innate immune responses.

=== Peptidoglycan binding ===
PGLYRP4 binds peptidoglycan, a polymer of β(1-4)-linked N-acetylglucosamine (GlcNAc) and N-acetylmuramic acid (MurNAc) cross-linked by short peptides, the main component of bacterial cell wall. PGLYRP4 (its C-terminal PGRP domain) binds peptidoglycan fragment, MurNAc-pentapeptide (MurNAc-L-Ala-γ-D-Gln-L-Lys-D-Ala-D-Ala), with Kd = 1.2 × 10^{−5}, but similar to PGLYRP3 (and unlike PGLYRP1) does not bind meso-diaminopimelic acid (m-DAP)-containing fragment (MurNAc-L-Ala-γ-D-Gln-DAP-D-Ala-D-Ala). m-DAP is present in the third position of peptidoglycan peptide in Gram-negative bacteria and Gram-positive bacilli, whereas L-lysine is in this position in peptidoglycan peptide in Gram-positive cocci. Thus, PGLYRP4 C-terminal PGRP domain has a preference for binding peptidoglycan fragments from Gram-positive cocci. The fine specificity of the PGLYRP4 N-terminal PGRP domain is not known.

=== Bactericidal activity ===
Human PGLYRP4 is directly bactericidal for both Gram-positive (Bacillus subtilis, Bacillus licheniformis, Bacillus cereus, Lactobacillus acidophilus, Listeria monocytogenes, Staphylococcus aureus) and Gram-negative (Escherichia coli, Proteus vulgaris, Salmonella enterica) bacteria and is also active against Chlamydia trachomatis.

In Gram-positive bacteria, human PGLYRP4 binds to the separation sites of the newly formed daughter cells, created by bacterial peptidoglycan-lytic endopeptidases, LytE and LytF in B. subtilis, which separate the daughter cells after cell division. These cell-separating endopeptidases likely expose PGLYRP4-binding muramyl peptides, as shown by co-localization of PGLYRP4 and LytE and LytF at the cell-separation sites, and no binding of PGLYRP4 to other regions of the cell wall with highly cross-linked peptidoglycan. This localization is necessary for the bacterial killing, because mutants that lack LytE and LytF endopeptidases and do not separate after cell division, do not bind PGLYRP4, and are also not readily killed by PGLYRP4.

The mechanism of bacterial killing by PGLYRP4 is based on induction of lethal envelope stress, which eventually leads to the shutdown of transcription and translation. PGLYRP4-induced killing involves simultaneous induction of three stress responses in both Gram-positive and Gram-negative bacteria: oxidative stress due to production of reactive oxygen species (hydrogen peroxide and hydroxyl radicals), thiol stress due to depletion (oxidation) of cellular thiols, and metal stress due to an increase in intracellular free (labile) metal ions. PGLYRP4-induced oxidative and thiol stress involve malfunction of the respiratory electron transport chain in bacteria. PGLYRP4-induced bacterial killing does not involve cell membrane permeabilization, which is typical for defensins and other antimicrobial peptides, cell wall hydrolysis, or osmotic shock. Human PGLYRP4 has synergistic bactericidal activity with antibacterial peptides.

=== Defense against infections ===
PGLYRP4 plays a limited role in host defense against infections. Intranasal administration of PGLYRP4 protects mice from lung infection with S. aureus and E. coli and PGLYRP4-deficient mice are more sensitive to Streptococcus pneumoniae–induced pneumonia.

=== Maintaining microbiome ===
Mouse PGLYRP4 plays a role in maintaining healthy microbiome, as PGLYRP4-deficient mice have significant changes in the composition of their intestinal microbiome, which affects their increased sensitivity to lung inflammation and severity of S. pneumoniae-induced pneumonia.

=== Effects on inflammation ===
Mouse PGLYRP4 plays a role in maintaining anti- and pro-inflammatory homeostasis in the intestine, skin, and lungs. PGLYRP4-deficient mice are more sensitive than wild type mice to dextran sodium sulfate (DSS)-induced colitis, which indicates that PGLYRP4 protects mice from DSS-induced colitis.

PGLYRP4-deficient mice are also more sensitive than wild type mice to experimentally induced atopic dermatitis. These results indicate that mouse PGLYRP4 is anti-inflammatory and protects skin from inflammation. This anti-inflammatory effect in the skin is due to decreased numbers and activity of T helper 17 (Th17) cells and increased numbers of T regulatory (Treg) cells. PGLYRP4-deficient mice also have increased inflammatory responses in the lungs during S. pneumoniae-induced pneumonia associated with impaired bacterial clearance and more severe pulmonary inflammation following Bordetella pertussis infection, indicating anti-inflammatory role of PGLYRP4 in the lungs.

== Medical relevance ==
Genetic PGLYRP4 variants are associated with some diseases. Patients with inflammatory bowel disease (IBD), which includes Crohn's disease and ulcerative colitis, have significantly more frequent missense variants in PGLYRP4 gene (and also in the other three PGLYRP genes) than healthy controls. PGLYRP4 variants are also associated with Parkinson's disease, psoriasis, and ovarian cancer. These results suggest that PGLYRP4 protects humans from these diseases, and that mutations in PGLYRP4 gene are among the genetic factors predisposing to these diseases. PGLYRP4 variants are also associated with the composition of airway microbiome.

== See also ==
- Peptidoglycan recognition protein
- Peptidoglycan recognition protein 1
- Peptidoglycan recognition protein 2
- Peptidoglycan recognition protein 3
- Peptidoglycan
- Innate immune system
- Bacterial cell walls
