= Roman Dziarski =

American scientist (born 1949)

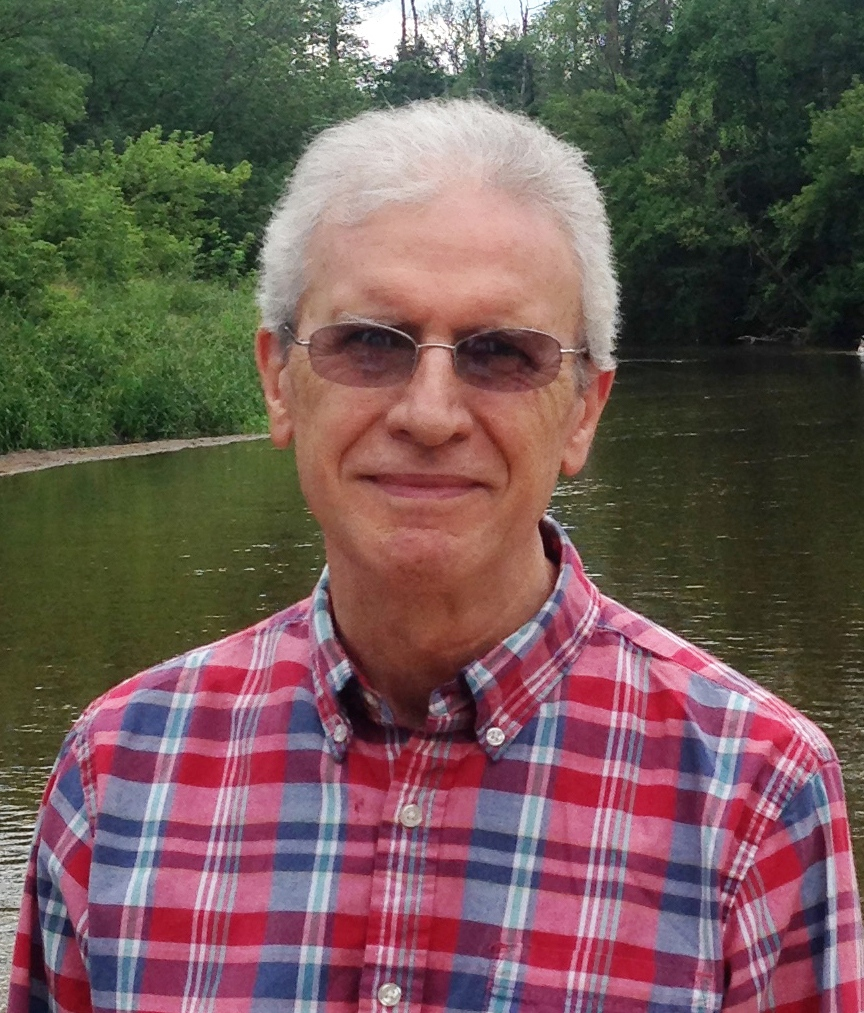
- Dziarski in 2017
- Born: December 11, 1949 (age 76); Warsaw, Poland
- Education: University of Warsaw, Poland (BS, MS) National Institute of Public Health, Warsaw, Poland (PhD)
- Occupation: Scientist
- Known for: Research on peptidoglycan recognition proteins, innate immunity, and peptidoglycan
- Title: Professor Emeritus of Microbiology and Immunology
- Scientific career
- Fields: Immunology, microbiology
- Workplaces: Indiana University School of Medicine

Roman Dziarski (Polish pronunciation: IPA: /ˈrɔ.man//ˈd͡ʑar.ski/ born December 11, 1949) is a Polish-born American immunologist and microbiologist. He is best known for his research on innate immunity and bacterial peptidoglycan, for discovering the family of human peptidoglycan recognition proteins, which comprises PGLYRP1, PGLYRP2, PGLYRP3, and PGLYRP4, and for defining the functions of these proteins.

Dziarski is currently Professor Emeritus of Microbiology and Immunology at Indiana University School of Medicine.

== Education ==
From 1963 to 1967, Dziarski received his secondary education at Reytan High School (Polish: VI Liceum Ogólnokształcące im. Tadeusza Reytana) in Warsaw, Poland, under the tutelage of the revered pedagogue, Ireneusz Gugulski. From 1967 to 1972, Dziarski attended the University of Warsaw with a major in Biology and Microbiology, which he studied under Władysław Kunicki-Goldfinger. He received his Bachelor of Sciences (BS) degree in 1971, and Master of Science (MS) degree in 1972. His MS Thesis was titled, Phenotypic expression of spontaneous mutations to nalidixic acid resistance in Escherichia coli K-12, with Roman Mycielski as his thesis advisor. From 1972 to 1973, Dziarski studied English at West London College in London, England. From 1973 to 1977, Dziarski was a Research Scientist in the Department of Bacteriology at the National Institute of Public Health (Polish: Narodowy Instytut Zdrowia Publicznego – Państwowy Zakład Higieny), Warsaw, Poland, where he performed research for his Doctor of Philosophy (Ph.D.) degree, which culminated in 1977 with the defense of his Ph.D. thesis, titled, Immunobiological properties of Staphylococcus aureus cell wall polysaccharides, with Janusz Jeljaszewicz as his thesis advisor. In September 1977, Dziarski emigrated to the USA.

== Academic positions ==
In 1977, Dziarski joined the Department of Microbiology, Immunology and Pathology at Temple University School of Podiatric Medicine in Philadelphia, Pennsylvania, USA, as a research associate and assistant professor. In 1978, he was promoted to assistant professor and in 1981 to associate professor. In 1985, Dziarski moved to the Department of Microbiology and Immunology at Indiana University School of Medicine–Northwest, in Gary, Indiana, USA, as an associate professor and a full member of the Indiana University Graduate School, in Bloomington, Indiana, USA. In 1991, Dziarski was promoted to a Full Professor of Microbiology and Immunology with tenure. He held this position until his retirement in 2021, when he became Professor Emeritus of Microbiology and Immunology.

== Scientific contributions ==
=== Role of peptidoglycan in innate immunity ===
In his early research, Dziarski focused on the role of bacterial peptidoglycan in innate immunity. He showed that peptidoglycan is an immunomodulator and a polyclonal activator of B lymphocytes. He determined the role of DNA synthesis, intracellular calcium, protein kinase C, and inhibitory G proteins in peptidoglycan-induced polyclonal B lymphocyte activation. He also established the role of peptidoglycan and other polyclonal B cell activators in the induction of autoantibody responses in various models of autoimmunity.

=== Peptidoglycan receptors and cell activation pathways ===
In his subsequent research, Dziarski set out to identify peptidoglycan receptors on immune cells that mediate the cell-activating and immunomodulating effects of peptidoglycan. His early attempts using biochemical methods were not successful, as they were prone to nonspecific interactions and technical artifacts. He also showed that similar problems and artifacts plagued the early attempts to identify the cell receptors for bacterial lipopolysaccharide and other cell activators.

The molecular biology approach to identifying the cell-activating peptidoglycan receptors was more successful. Using this approach, Dziarski and his research group, in collaboration with Dipika Gupta and her group (also at Indiana University School of Medicine), identified CD14 as the cell-activating receptor for peptidoglycan and showed that CD14 physically binds peptidoglycan. Furthermore, Dziarski's and Gupta's groups identified the involvement of several signal transduction molecules and pathways in peptidoglycan-induced cell activation. Dziarski also established that chemokines are the main pro-inflammatory mediators in human monocytes activated by peptidoglycan and other bacterial cell activators.

Using similar molecular biology approach the research groups of Carsten J. Kirschning (at Tularik Inc.) and Douglas Golenbock (at Boston University School of Medicine) in collaboration with Dziarski, discovered that TLR2 is the cell-activating receptor for peptidoglycan and other components of Gram-positive bacteria. In the follow-up studies, Dziarski's and Gupta's groups identified the signal transduction pathway activated by peptidoglycan through TLR2 and verified that TLR2 is indeed the peptidoglycan cell-activating receptor.

=== Discovery of peptidoglycan recognition proteins ===
Dziarski's best known contribution to innate immunity is his research on mammalian peptidoglycan recognition proteins (PGRPs). In 2001, Dziarski's and Gupta's groups discovered and cloned three human PGRPs, which they named PGRP-L, PGRP-Iα, and PGRP-Iβ (for long and intermediate size transcripts). They established that the human genome codes for a family of 4 PGRPs: PGRP-S (short PGRP), PGRP-L, PGRP-Iα, and PGRP-Iβ. Subsequently, the Human Genome Organization Gene Nomenclature Committee changed the gene symbols of PGRP-S, PGRP-L, PGRP-Iα, and PGRP-Iβ to PGLYRP1, PGLYRP2, PGLYRP3, and PGLYRP4, respectively, and this nomenclature is currently also used for other mammalian PGRPs.

Dziarski and his collaborators showed that mammalian PGRPs are selectively expressed in immune and epithelial cells.

=== Functions of peptidoglycan recognition proteins ===
Dziarski and his collaborators established that all mammalian PGRPs bind bacterial peptidoglycan. Then, they identified the functions of human PGRPs: PGLYRP2 is a peptidoglycan-lytic enzyme, N-acetylmuramoyl-L-alanine amidase, and PGLYRP1, PGLYRP3, and PGLYRP4 are directly bactericidal for both Gram-positive and Gram-negative bacteria.

In further research, Dziarski's group established the mechanism of bacterial killing by human PGRPs. They showed that human PGRPs kill bacteria by simultaneously inducing three synergistic stress responses: oxidative stress, thiol stress, and metal stress, by interfering with the function of the bacterial respiratory electron transport chain. Dziarski also showed that bacterial killing by these PGRPs does not involve cell membrane permeabilization, cell wall hydrolysis, or osmotic shock, but is synergistic with antibacterial peptides.

=== Cloning and functions of zebrafish peptidoglycan recognition proteins ===
Collaborative research of Dipika Gupta's and Dziarski's groups also identified and cloned three zebrafish PGRPs and showed that they are highly expressed in eggs, developing embryos, and adult tissues that contact the external environment. They further showed that these PGRPs have both peptidoglycan-lytic amidase and bactericidal activities and are essential for defense against bacterial infections and survival of the developing zebrafish embryos.

=== In vivo role of mammalian peptidoglycan recognition proteins ===
Dziarski's group also identified several in vivo functions of mammalian PGRPs. Dziarski showed that despite their bactericidal activity, mammalian PGRPs have only a limited role in defense against infections. Intranasal application of PGLYRP3 or PGLYRP4 in mice protects from intranasal lung infection with Staphylococcus aureus and Escherichia coli, and PGLYRP1-deficient mice are more sensitive to systemic infections with non-pathogenic bacteria (Micrococcus luteus and Bacillus subtilis).

Dziarski's group further showed that mouse PGRPs play a role in maintaining healthy microbiome, because PGLYRP1-, PGLYRP2-, PGLYRP3-, and PGLYRP4-deficient mice have significant changes in the composition of their intestinal microbiomes. PGLYRP1-deficient mice also have changes in their lung microbiome.

Dziarski's and Gupta's groups further showed that mouse PGRPs play a role in maintaining anti- and pro-inflammatory homeostasis in the intestine, skin, lungs, and joints. They demonstrated that all four PGLYRPs protect mice from dextran sodium sulfate (DSS)-induced colitis and the effect of PGLYRP2 and PGLYRP3 on the intestinal microbiome is responsible for this protection. They showed that PGLYRP3 and PGLYRP4 are anti-inflammatory and protect mice from experimentally induced atopic dermatitis, and PGLYRP2 is also anti-inflammatory and protects mice from experimentally induced psoriasis-like inflammation. They also showed that some PGRPs have opposite effects, i.e., PGLYRP2 also has a pro-inflammatory effect, as it promotes the development of experimental arthritis, and PGLYRP1 is pro-inflammatory and promotes experimentally induced asthma and skin inflammation in mice. The pro-inflammatory effect of PGLYRP1 on asthma depends on the PGLYRP1-regulated intestinal microbiome.

=== Disease associations of peptidoglycan recognition proteins ===
In collaborative research, Dipika Gupta's and Dziarski's groups showed that patients with two forms of inflammatory bowel disease (IBD), Crohn's disease and ulcerative colitis, have significantly more frequent missense variants in all four PGLYRP genes than healthy control individuals. These results suggest that PGRPs may protect humans from these inflammatory diseases, and that mutations in PGLYRP genes may be among the genetic factors predisposing to these diseases.

== Publications and research support ==
Dziarski authored over 150 scientific publications, which have over 15,000 citations, h-index of 54, and i10-index of 92. From 1979 to 2020, Dziarski was a Principal Investigator on more than 20 research grants, including 10 awards from the National Institutes of Health.

== Teaching ==
Dziarski is a dedicated educator. From 1978 to 1984, he taught Immunology and Microbiology to podiatric medicine students at Temple University School of Podiatric Medicine. From 1985 to 2020, he taught Immunology, Microbiology, and elements of Pathology and Pharmacology to medical students at Indiana University School of Medicine–Northwest. He was a Course Director of Microbiology and Immunology, and in 1990 introduced an innovative Problem-Based Learning curriculum. He authored a chapter on Innate Immunity, published in three editions of the popular medical textbook, Schaechter's Mechanisms of Microbial Disease, and a chapter on peptidoglycan in Molecular Medical Microbiology textbook. Dziarski received seven Teaching Awards at Indiana University.

== World War II book ==
In 2023 Dziarski published a World War II family memoir, "How We Outwitted and Survived the Nazis: The True Story of the Holocaust Rescuers, Zofia Sterner and Her Family", which received positive reviews. Polish translation was published in 2025.

== Awards and honors ==
- Stanford University List of World's Top 2% Scientists, ranked in the top 0.5% to 0.7% of world's scientists (2018-2024)
- Indiana University Trustees' Teaching Awards (2001, 2012, and 2018)
- Indiana University School of Medicine Class of 2016 Faculty Teaching Award (2016)
- Indiana University Outstanding Educator (2012, 2013, and 2014)
- Innovation Fellow Award from the Society of Innovators, sponsored by Ivy Tech State College in Indiana (2007)
- Joseph A. Negri Trust Award and Dedication of the Laboratory (2006)
- Indiana University School of Medicine Eminent Scholar (1998 – 1999)
- Editorial Board of Infection and Immunity, the official journal of the American Society for Microbiology (1982 – 2020)
- Editorial Board of Current Immunology Reviews (2004 – 2020)
- Member of the American Association of Immunologists and Federation of American Societies for Experimental Biology (1982 – 2020)
- Member of the American Society for Microbiology (1978 – 2020)
- Dean's Award to the Best Graduating Student at the Faculty of Biology, University of Warsaw, Poland (1971)

== Family ==
Dziarski's mother (Janina Dziarska, née Domańska) and father (Kazimierz W. Dziarski) were both dentists in Warsaw, Poland. Dziarski was married to Agnes Dziarski (née Rewkiewicz), a dentist, from 1971 to 1994. In 1996, Dziarski married Dipika Gupta, a biochemist and molecular biologist at Indiana University School of Medicine. Dziarski has three children: Matthew Dziarski, Alisha Dziarski, and Anjali Dziarski.

== See also ==
- Peptidoglycan recognition proteins
- PGLYRP1
- PGLYRP2
- PGLYRP3
- PGLYRP4
