= Peptidoglycan recognition protein 2 =

Protein-coding gene in the species Homo sapiens

PGLYRP2

Identifiers
- Aliases: PGLYRP2, HMFT0141, PGLYRPL, PGRP-L, PGRPL, TAGL-like, tagL, tagL-alpha, tagl-beta, peptidoglycan recognition protein 2
- External IDs: OMIM: 608199; MGI: 1928099; GeneCards: PGLYRP2
Enzyme activity
EC #	BRENDA	ExPASy	KEGG	MetaCyc
3.5.1.28	↗	↗	↗	↗

Gene location (Human)
Chr.	Chromosome 19 (human)
Band	19p13.12	Start	15,468,645 bp
Band	19p13.12	End	15,498,956 bp

Gene location (Mouse)
Chr.	Chromosome 17 (mouse)
Band	17|17 B1	Start	32,631,433 bp
Band	17|17 B1	End	32,643,141 bp
RNA expression pattern
Bgee	Human / Mouse (ortholog); Top expressed in: right lobe of liver; left testis; right testis; granulocyte; monocyte; blood; lactiferous gland; prostate; skin of abdomen; renal cortex / Top expressed in: left lobe of liver; thymus; mesenteric lymph nodes; embryo; blood; spleen; zygote; pharynx; secondary oocyte; granulocyte; More reference expression data
BioGPS	n/a
Gene ontology
Molecular function	metal ion binding; zinc ion binding; hydrolase activity; peptidoglycan immune receptor activity; peptidoglycan binding; N-acetylmuramoyl-L-alanine amidase activity
Cellular component	intracellular anatomical structure; membrane; extracellular exosome; extracellular region; extracellular space
Biological process	immune system process; peptide amidation; negative regulation of natural killer cell differentiation involved in immune response; negative regulation of interferon-gamma production; innate immune response; detection of bacterium; regulation of inflammatory response; defense response to Gram-positive bacterium; peptidoglycan catabolic process; pattern recognition receptor signaling pathway; antimicrobial humoral response
Sources:Amigo / QuickGO
Orthologs
Databases	NCBI: entry; OMA: entry
Species	Human	Mouse
Entrez	114770	57757
Ensembl	ENSG00000161031	ENSMUSG00000079563
UniProt	Q96PD5	Q8VCS0
RefSeq (mRNA)	NM_052890; NM_001363546	NM_001271476; NM_001271477; NM_001271478; NM_001271479; NM_021319
RefSeq (protein)	NP_443122; NP_001350475	NP_001258405; NP_001258406; NP_001258407; NP_001258408; NP_067294
Location (UCSC)	Chr 19: 15.47 – 15.5 Mb	Chr 17: 32.63 – 32.64 Mb
PubMed search
- Wikidata
View/Edit Human	View/Edit Mouse

Peptidoglycan recognition protein 2 (PGLYRP2) is an enzyme (EC 3.5.1.28), N-acetylmuramoyl-L-alanine amidase (NAMLAA), that hydrolyzes bacterial cell wall peptidoglycan and is encoded by the PGLYRP2 gene.

== Discovery ==
The N-acetylmuramoyl-L-alanine amidase enzymatic activity was first observed in human and mouse serum in 1981 by Branko Ladešić and coworkers. The enzyme (abbreviated NAMLAA) was then purified from human serum by this and other groups. The sequence of 15 N-terminal amino acids of NAMLAA was identified, but the cDNA for the protein was not cloned and the gene encoding NAMLAA was not known.

In 2000, Dan Hultmark and coworkers discovered a family of 12 Peptidoglycan Recognition Protein (PGRP) genes in Drosophila melanogaster and by homology searches of available human and mouse sequences predicted the presence of long forms of human and mouse PGRPs, which they named PGRP-L by analogy to long forms of insect PGRPs.

In 2001, Roman Dziarski and coworkers discovered and cloned three human PGRPs, named PGRP-L, PGRP-Iα, and PGRP-Iβ (for long and intermediate size transcripts), and established that human genome codes for a family of 4 PGRPs: PGRP-S (short PGRP) and PGRP-L, PGRP-Iα, and PGRP-Iβ. Subsequently, the Human Genome Organization Gene Nomenclature Committee changed the gene symbols of PGRP-S, PGRP-L, PGRP-Iα, and PGRP-Iβ to PGLYRP1 (peptidoglycan recognition protein 1), PGLYRP2 (peptidoglycan recognition protein 2), PGLYRP3 (peptidoglycan recognition protein 3), and PGLYRP4 (peptidoglycan recognition protein 4), respectively, and this nomenclature is currently also used for other mammalian PGRPs. Sergei Kiselev and coworkers also independently cloned mouse PGLYRP2 (which they named TagL).

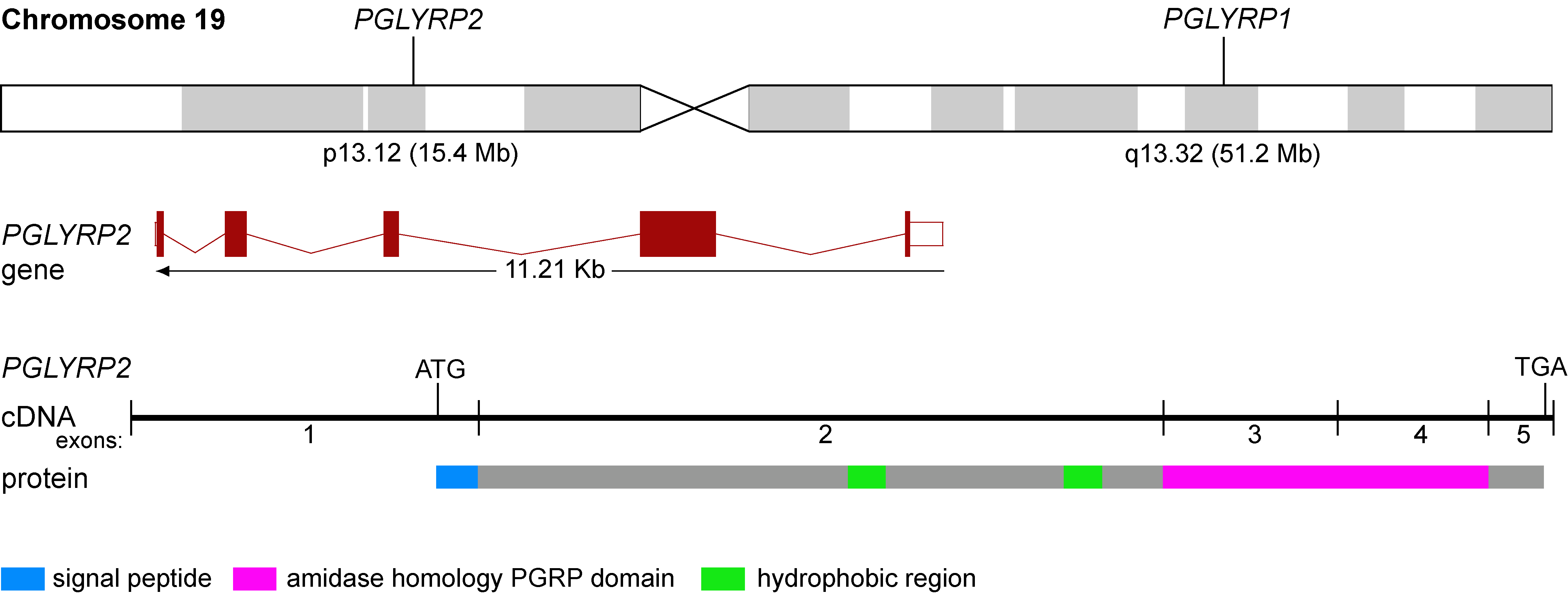
Location of human PGLYRP2 gene on chromosome 19 and schematic gene, cDNA, and protein structures with exons, introns, and protein domains indicated.

In 2003 Håkan Steiner and coworkers and Roman Dziarski and coworkers discovered that mouse and human PGLYRP2 (PGRP-L) proteins encoded by the mouse and human PGLYRP2 genes are N-acetylmuramoyl-L-alanine amidases. Recombinant and native human PGLYRP2 proteins were then further shown to be identical with the previously identified and purified serum NAMLAA.

== Tissue distribution and secretion ==
Human and mouse PGLYRP2 is constitutively expressed in the adult and fetal liver, from where it is secreted into the blood. PGLYRP2 (NAMLAA) is present in human plasma at 100 to 200 μg/mL and at lower concentrations in saliva, milk, cerebrospinal fluid, and synovial fluid. PGLYRP2 is also expressed to a much lower level in the colon, lymph nodes, spleen, thymus, heart, and polymorphonuclear leukocyte granules. PGLYRP2 is differentially expressed in the developing brain and this expression is influenced by the intestinal microbiome. Bacteria and cytokines induce low level of PGLYRP2 expression in the skin and gastrointestinal and oral epithelial cells, and also in intestinal intraepithelial T lymphocytes, dendritic cells, NK (natural killer) cells, and inflammatory macrophages. Some mammals, e.g. pigs, express multiple splice forms of PGLYRP2 with differential expression.

Bacteria and cytokines induce expression of PGLYRP2 in epithelial cells through the p38 mitogen activated protein kinase (MAPK) and IRAK1 (interleukin-1 receptor-associated kinase 1) signaling pathways. Constitutive and induced expression of PGLYRP2 is controlled by different transcription factors whose binding sequences are located in different regions of the PGLYRP2 promoter. Constitutive expression of PGLYRP2 in hepatocytes is regulated by transcription factors c-Jun and ATF2 (activating transcription factor 2) through sequences in the proximal region of the promoter. Induced expression of PGLYRP2 in keratinocytes is regulated by transcription factors NF-κB (nuclear factor kappa-light-chain-enhancer of activated B cells) and Sp1 (specificity protein 1) through sequences in the distal region of the promoter.

== Structure ==
PGLYRP2 has one canonical carboxy-terminal catalytic peptidoglycan-binding type 2 amidase domain (also known as a PGRP domain) with predicted peptidoglycan-binding and catalytic cleft with walls formed by α-helices and the floor by a β-sheet. PGLYRP2 also has a long N-terminal segment that comprises two thirds of the PGLYRP2 sequence, has two hydrophobic regions, is unique and not found in other mammalian PGLYRP1, PGLYRP3, and PGLYRP4 and in invertebrate PGRPs, and contains intrinsically disordered region with hepatitis B virus (HBV) DNA-binding domain. The C-terminal segment is also longer than in other mammalian PGLYRPs. PGLYRP2 has two pairs of cysteines in the PGRP domain that are conserved in all human PGRPs and are predicted to form two disulfide bonds. Human PGLYRP2 is glycosylated and secreted, and forms non-disulfide-linked homodimers.

PGLYRP2, similar to all other amidase-active PGRPs (invertebrate and vertebrate), has a conserved Zn^{2+}-binding site in the peptidoglycan-binding cleft, which is also present in bacteriophage type 2 amidases and consists of two histidines, one tyrosine, and one cysteine (His411, Tyr447, His522, Cys530 in human PGLYRP2).

== Functions ==
The PGLYRP2 protein plays an important role in the innate immune responses and host defense.

=== Peptidoglycan binding and hydrolysis ===
PGLYRP2 is an enzyme (EC 3.5.1.28), N-acetylmuramoyl-L-alanine amidase, that binds and hydrolyzes bacterial cell wall peptidoglycan. Peptidoglycan is the main component of bacterial cell wall and is a polymer of β(1–4)-linked N-acetylglucosamine (GlcNAc) and N-acetylmuramic acid (MurNAc) with MurNAc-attached short peptides, typically composed of alternating L and D amino acids, that cross-link the adjacent polysaccharide chains.

PGLYRP2 hydrolyzes the amide bond between the MurNAc and L-Ala, the first amino acid in the stem peptide. This hydrolysis separates the crosslinking peptides from the polysaccharide chains and solubilizes cross-linked bacterial peptidoglycan into uncross-linked polysaccharide chains. The minimal peptidoglycan fragment hydrolyzed by PGLYRP2 is MurNAc-tripeptide.

The peptidoglycan-binding site, which is also the amidase catalytic domain, is located in the C-terminal PGRP domain. This PGRP domain is sufficient for the enzymatic activity of PGLYRP2, although this activity of the isolated C-terminal fragment is diminished compared with the entire PGLYRP2 molecule. Zn^{2+} and Zn^{2+}-binding amino acids (His411, Tyr447, and Cys530 in human PGLYRP2) are required for the amidase activity. Cys419 in human PGLYRP2, which is broadly conserved in invertebrate and vertebrate PRGPs, forms a disulfide bond with Cys425 (in human PGLYRP2) and is required for the amidase activity, as this disulfide bond is essential for the structural integrity of the PGRP domain. Cys530 is conserved in all amidase-active vertebrate and invertebrate PGRPs, whereas non-catalytic PGRPs (including mammalian PGLYRP1, PGLYRP3, and PGLYRP4) have serine in this position, and thus the presence of Cys or Ser in this position can be used to predict amidase activity of PGRPs. However, Cys530 and seven other amino acids that are all required for the amidase activity of PGRPs are not sufficient for the amidase activity, which requires additional so far unidentified amino acids.

=== Defense against infections ===
PGLYRP2 plays a limited role in host defense against infections. PGLYRP2-deficient mice are more sensitive to Pseudomonas aeruginosa-induced keratitis and Streptococcus pneumoniae-induced pneumonia and sepsis. However, PGLYRP2-deficient mice did not show a changed susceptibility to systemic Escherichia coli, Staphylococcus aureus, and Candida albicans infections or intestinal Salmonella enterica infection, although the latter was accompanied by increased inflammation in the cecum.

Although PGLYRP2 is not directly bacteriolytic, it has antibacterial activity against both Gram-positive and Gram-negative bacteria and Chlamydia trachomatis.

Human and mouse PGLYRP2 promote hepatitis B virus (HBV) clearance in vitro in hepatocytes and in HBV-infected mice. PGLYRP2 through its HBV DNA-binding domain recognizes covalently closed circular DNA (cccDNA) of HBV sequestering it in the nucleus and separating it from the cellular viral replication machinery. Additionally, PGLYRP2 suppresses HBV capsid assembly by directly interacting through its PGRP domain with the viral capsid and promoting secretion of the PGLYRP2-HBV capsid complexes.

=== Maintaining microbiome ===
Mouse PGLYRP2 plays a role in maintaining healthy microbiome, as PGLYRP2-deficient mice have significant changes in the composition of their intestinal microbiome, which affect their sensitivity to colitis.

=== Effects on inflammation ===
PGLYRP2 directly and indirectly affects inflammation and plays a role in maintaining anti- and pro-inflammatory homeostasis in the intestine, skin, joints, and brain.

Hydrolysis of peptidoglycan by PGLYRP2 diminishes peptidoglycan's pro-inflammatory activity. This effect is likely due to amidase activity of PGLYRP2, which separates the stem peptide from MurNAc in peptidoglycan and destroys the motif required for the peptidoglycan-induced activation of NOD2 (nucleotide-binding oligomerization domain-containing protein 2), one of the proinflammatory peptidoglycan receptors.

PGLYRP2-deficient mice are more susceptible than wild type mice to dextran sodium sulfate (DSS)-induced colitis, which indicates that PGLYRP2 protects mice from DSS-induced colitis. Intestinal microbiome is important for this protection, because this increased sensitivity to colitis could be transferred to wild type germ-free mice by microbiome transplant from PGLYRP2-deficient mice.

PGLYRP2-deficient mice are more susceptible than wild type mice to the development of experimentally induced psoriasis-like inflammation, which indicates that PGLYRP2 is anti-inflammatory and protects mice from this type of skin inflammation. This pro-inflammatory effect in PGLYRP2-deficient mice is due to the increased numbers and activity of T helper 17 (Th17) cells and decreased numbers of T regulatory (Treg) cells. PGLYRP2-deficient mice are more susceptible than wild type mice to S. enterica-induced intestinal inflammation, which indicates that PGLYRP2 also has anti-inflammatory effect in the intestinal tract.

However, PGLYRP2 also has opposite effects. PGLYRP2-deficient mice are more resistant than wild type mice to the development of arthritis induced by systemic administration of peptidoglycan or MurNAc-L-Ala-D-isoGln peptidoglycan fragment (muramyl dipeptide, MDP). In this model, PGLYRP2 is required for the production of chemokines and cytokines that attract neutrophils to the arthritic joints. PGLYRP2-deficient mice are also more resistant than wild type mice to bacterially induced keratitis and inflammation in S. pneumoniae-induced lung infection. Moreover, PGLYRP2-deficient mice are more resistant to weight loss in a model of chemotherapy-induced gastrointestinal toxicity, which indicates that in wild type mice PGLYRP2 contributes to the chemotherapy-induced weight loss. PGLYRP2 also promotes NOD2-induced production of proinflammatory cytokines in macrophages. These results indicate that under certain conditions PGLYRP2 has pro-inflammatory effects.

PGLYRP2-deficient mice also show higher sociability and decreased levels of anxiety-like behaviors compared with wild type mice, which indicate that PGLYRP2 affects behavior in mice.

== Medical relevance ==
Genetic PGLYRP2 variants or changed expression of PGLYRP2 are associated with some diseases. Patients with inflammatory bowel disease (IBD), which includes Crohn's disease and ulcerative colitis, have significantly more frequent missense variants in PGLYRP2 gene (and also in the other three PGLYRP genes) than healthy controls. These results suggest that PGLYRP2 protects humans from these inflammatory diseases, and that mutations in PGLYRP2 gene are among the genetic factors predisposing to these diseases. PGLYRP2 variants are also associated with esophageal squamous cell carcinoma and Parkinson's disease.

Increased serum PGLYRP2 levels are present in patients with systemic lupus erythematosus (and correlate with disease activity index, renal damage, and abnormal lipid profile), chronic hepatitis B virus infection, myocardial infarction, and coronary artery disease (and correlate with the severity of the disease).

Decreased expression of PGLYRP2 is found in HIV-associated tuberculosis, drug-sensitive tuberculosis, Lyme disease, hepatocellular carcinoma, and polyarteritis nodosa.

Autoantibodies to PGLYRP2 are significantly increased in patients with rheumatoid arthritis.

== See also ==
- Peptidoglycan recognition protein
- Peptidoglycan recognition protein 1
- Peptidoglycan recognition protein 3
- Peptidoglycan recognition protein 4
- Peptidoglycan
- Innate immune system
- Bacterial cell walls
