= Peptidoglycan recognition protein 3 =

Protein found in humans

PGLYRP3

Identifiers
- Aliases: PGLYRP3, PGRP-Ialpha, PGRPIA, PGLYRPIalpha, peptidoglycan recognition protein 3
- External IDs: OMIM: 608197; MGI: 2685266; GeneCards: PGLYRP3
Available structures
PDB	Ortholog search: PDBe RCSB
PDB	List of PDB id codes 1SK3, 1SK4, 1TWQ, 2APH

Gene location (Human)
Chr.	Chromosome 1 (human)
Band	1q21.3	Start	153,297,116 bp
Band	1q21.3	End	153,312,952 bp

Gene location (Mouse)
Chr.	Chromosome 3 (mouse)
Band	3|3 F1	Start	91,921,890 bp
Band	3|3 F1	End	91,938,889 bp
RNA expression pattern
Bgee	Human / Mouse (ortholog); Top expressed in: skin of abdomen; skin of leg; vagina; tonsil; ectocervix; gonad; minor salivary glands; right lung; upper respiratory tract; face / Top expressed in: esophagus; lip; embryo; zone of skin; tail of embryo; spinal ganglia; peripheral nervous system; foregut; stomach; limb; More reference expression data
BioGPS	n/a
Gene ontology
Molecular function	zinc ion binding; N-acetylmuramoyl-L-alanine amidase activity; peptidoglycan immune receptor activity; peptidoglycan binding; protein heterodimerization activity
Cellular component	intracellular anatomical structure; membrane; extracellular region; protein-containing complex; extracellular space
Biological process	immune system process; negative regulation of natural killer cell differentiation involved in immune response; negative regulation of interferon-gamma production; innate immune response; defense response to bacterium; detection of bacterium; defense response to Gram-positive bacterium; peptidoglycan catabolic process; pattern recognition receptor signaling pathway; antimicrobial humoral response; positive regulation of cytolysis in other organism; antimicrobial humoral immune response mediated by antimicrobial peptide; killing of cells of other organism
Sources:Amigo / QuickGO
Orthologs
Databases	NCBI: entry; OMA: entry
Species	Human	Mouse
Entrez	114771	242100
Ensembl	ENSG00000159527	ENSMUSG00000042244
UniProt	Q96LB9	A1A547
RefSeq (mRNA)	NM_052891	NM_207247
RefSeq (protein)	NP_443123	NP_997130
Location (UCSC)	Chr 1: 153.3 – 153.31 Mb	Chr 3: 91.92 – 91.94 Mb
PubMed search
- Wikidata
View/Edit Human	View/Edit Mouse

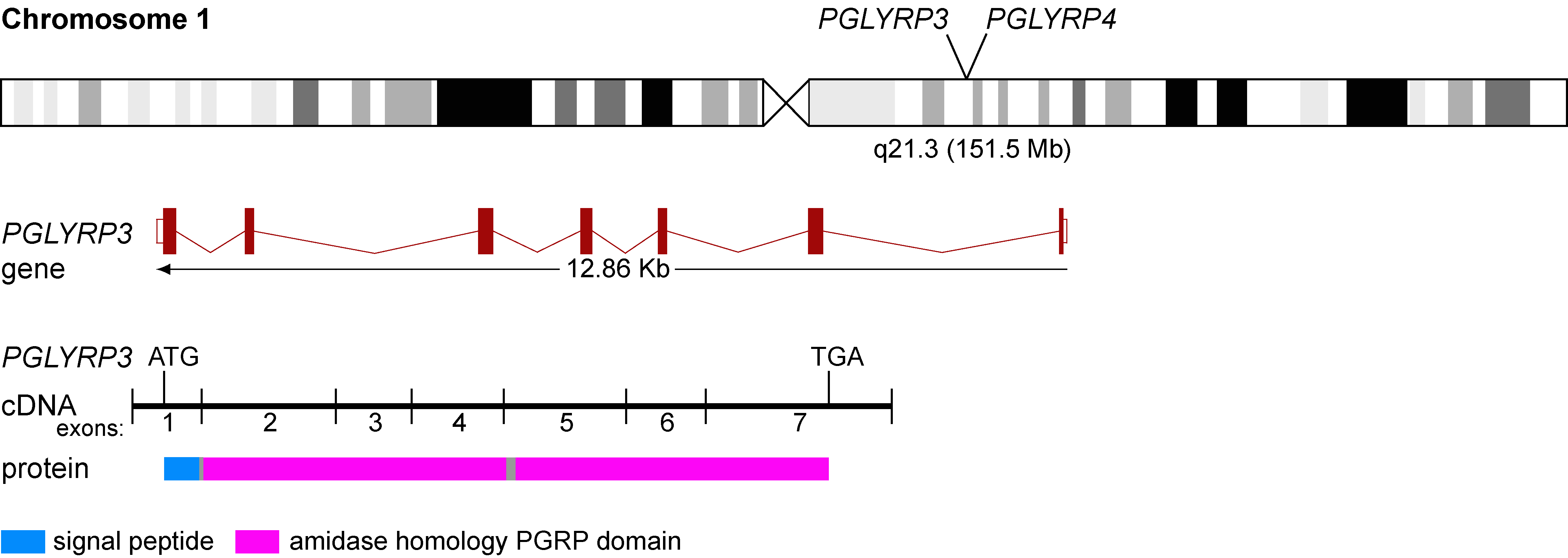
Location of human PGLYRP3 gene on chromosome 1 and schematic gene, cDNA, and protein structures with exons, introns, and protein domains indicated

Peptidoglycan recognition protein 3 (PGLYRP3, formerly PGRP-Iα) is an antibacterial and anti-inflammatory innate immunity protein that in humans is encoded by the PGLYRP3 gene.

== Discovery ==
PGLYRP3 (formerly PGRP-Iα), a member of a family of human Peptidoglycan Recognition Proteins (PGRPs), was discovered in 2001 by Roman Dziarski and coworkers who cloned and identified the genes for three human PGRPs, PGRP-L, PGRP-Iα, and PGRP-Iβ (named for long and intermediate size transcripts), and established that human genome codes for a family of 4 PGRPs: PGRP-S (short PGRP or PGRP-S) and PGRP-L, PGRP-Iα, and PGRP-Iβ. Subsequently, the Human Genome Organization Gene Nomenclature Committee changed the gene symbols of PGRP-S, PGRP-L, PGRP-Iα, and PGRP-Iβ to PGLYRP1 (peptidoglycan recognition protein 1), PGLYRP2 (peptidoglycan recognition protein 2), PGLYRP3 (peptidoglycan recognition protein 3), and PGLYRP4 (peptidoglycan recognition protein 4), respectively, and this nomenclature is currently also used for other mammalian PGRPs.

== Tissue distribution and secretion ==
PGLYRP3 has similar expression to PGLYRP4 (peptidoglycan recognition protein 4) but not identical. PGLYRP3 is constitutively expressed in the skin, in the eye, and in the mucous membranes in the tongue, throat, and esophagus, and at a much lower level in the remaining parts of the intestinal tract. Bacteria and their products increase the expression of PGLYRP3 in keratinocytes and oral epithelial cells. Mouse PGLYRP3 is also differentially expressed in the developing brain and this expression is influenced by the intestinal microbiome. PGLYRP3 is secreted and forms disulfide-linked dimers.

== Structure ==
PGLYRP3, similar to PGLYRP4, has two peptidoglycan-binding type 2 amidase domains (also known as PGRP domains), which are not identical (have 38% amino acid identity in humans) and do not have amidase enzymatic activity. PGLYRP3 is secreted, it is glycosylated, and its glycosylation is required for its bactericidal activity. PGLYRP3 forms disulfide-linked homodimers, but when expressed in the same cells with PGLYRP4, it forms PGLYRP3:PGLYRP4 disulfide-linked heterodimers.

The C-terminal peptidoglycan-binding domain of human PGLYRP3 has been crystallized and its structure solved and is similar to human PGLYRP1. PGLYRP3 C-terminal PGRP domain contains a central β-sheet composed of five β-strands and three α-helices and N-terminal segment unique to PGRPs and not found in bacteriophage and prokaryotic amidases.

Human PGLYRP3 C-terminal PGRP domain, similar to PGLYRP1, has three pairs of cysteines, which form three disulfide bonds at positions 178–300, 194–238, and 214–220. The Cys214–Cys220 disulfide is broadly conserved in invertebrate and vertebrate PRGPs, the Cys178–Cys300 disulfide is conserved in all mammalian PGRPs, and the Cys194–238 disulfide is unique to mammalian PGLYRP1, PGLYRP3, and PGLYRP4, but not found in the amidase-active PGLYRP2. The structures of the entire PGLYRP3 molecule (with two PGRP domains) and of the disulfide-linked dimer are unknown.

PGLYRP3 C-terminal PGRP domain contains peptidoglycan-binding site, which is a long cleft whose walls are formed by α-helix and five β-loops and the floor by a β-sheet. This site binds muramyl-tripeptide (MurNAc-L-Ala-D-isoGln-L-Lys), but can also accommodate larger peptidoglycan fragments, such as disaccharide-pentapeptide. Located opposite the peptidoglycan-binding cleft is a large hydrophobic groove, formed by residues 177–198 (the PGRP-specific segment).

== Functions ==
The PGLYRP3 protein plays an important role in the innate immune responses.

=== Peptidoglycan binding ===
PGLYRP3 binds peptidoglycan, a polymer of β(1-4)-linked N-acetylglucosamine (GlcNAc) and N-acetylmuramic acid (MurNAc) cross-linked by short peptides, the main component of bacterial cell wall. The smallest peptidoglycan fragment that binds to human PGLYRP3 is MurNAc-tripeptide (MurNAc-L-Ala-D-isoGln-L-Lys), which binds with low affinity (Kd = 4.5 × 10^{−4} M), whereas a larger fragment, MurNAc-pentapeptide (MurNAc-L-Ala-γ-D-Gln-L-Lys-D-Ala-D-Ala), binds with higher affinity (Kd = 6 × 10^{−6} M). Human PGLYRP3, in contrast to PGLYRP1, does not bind meso-diaminopimelic acid (m-DAP) containing fragment (MurNAc-L-Ala-γ-D-Gln-DAP-D-Ala-D-Ala). m-DAP is present in the third position of peptidoglycan peptide in Gram-negative bacteria and Gram-positive bacilli, whereas L-lysine is in this position in peptidoglycan peptide in Gram-positive cocci. Thus, PGLYRP3 C-terminal PGRP domain has a preference for binding peptidoglycan fragments from Gram-positive cocci. Binding of MurNAc-pentapeptide induces structural rearrangements in the binding site that are essential for entry of the ligand and locks the ligand in the binding cleft. The fine specificity of the PGLYRP3 N-terminal PGRP domain is not known.

=== Bactericidal activity ===
Human PGLYRP3 is directly bactericidal for both Gram-positive (Bacillus subtilis, Bacillus licheniformis, Bacillus cereus, Lactobacillus acidophilus, Listeria monocytogenes, Staphylococcus aureus, Streptococcus pyogenes) and Gram-negative (Escherichia coli, Proteus vulgaris, Salmonella enterica, Shigella sonnei, Pseudomonas aeruginosa) bacteria.

The mechanism of bacterial killing by PGLYRP3 is based on induction of lethal envelope stress, which eventually leads to the shutdown of transcription and translation. PGLYRP3-induced killing involves simultaneous induction of three stress responses in both Gram-positive and Gram-negative bacteria: oxidative stress due to production of reactive oxygen species (hydrogen peroxide and hydroxyl radicals), thiol stress due to depletion (oxidation) of cellular thiols, and metal stress due to an increase in intracellular free (labile) metal ions. PGLYRP3-induced bacterial killing does not involve cell membrane permeabilization, which is typical for defensins and other antimicrobial peptides, cell wall hydrolysis, or osmotic shock. Human PGLYRP3 has synergistic bactericidal activity with antibacterial peptides.

=== Defense against infections ===
PGLYRP3 plays a limited role in host defense against infections. Intranasal administration of PGLYRP3 protects mice from lung infection with S. aureus and E. coli, but PGLYRP3-deficient mice do not have altered sensitivity to Streptococcus pneumoniae-induced pneumonia.

=== Maintaining microbiome ===
Mouse PGLYRP3 plays a role in maintaining healthy microbiome, as PGLYRP3-deficient mice have significant changes in the composition of their intestinal microbiome, which affect their sensitivity to colitis.

=== Effects on inflammation ===
Mouse PGLYRP3 plays a role in maintaining anti- and pro-inflammatory homeostasis in the intestine and skin. PGLYRP3-deficient mice are more sensitive than wild type mice to dextran sodium sulfate (DSS)-induced colitis, which indicates that PGLYRP3 protects mice from DSS-induced colitis. The anti-inflammatory effect of PGLYRP3 on DSS-induced colitis depends on the PGLYRP3-regulated intestinal microbiome, because this greater sensitivity of PGLYRP3-deficient mice to DSS-induced colitis could be transferred to wild type germ-free mice or to antibiotic-treated mice by microbiome transplant from PGLYRP3-deficient mice or by PGLYRP3-regulated bacteria. PGLYRP3 is also directly anti-inflammatory in intestinal epithelial cells.

PGLYRP3-deficient mice are more sensitive than wild type mice to experimentally induced atopic dermatitis. These results indicate that mouse PGLYRP3 is anti-inflammatory and protects skin from inflammation. This anti-inflammatory effect is due to decreased numbers and activity of T helper 17 (Th17) cells and increased numbers of T regulatory (Treg) cells.

== Medical relevance ==
Genetic PGLYRP3 variants are associated with some diseases. Patients with inflammatory bowel disease (IBD), which includes Crohn's disease and ulcerative colitis, have significantly more frequent missense variants in PGLYRP3 gene (and also in the other three PGLYRP genes) than healthy controls. PGLYRP3 variants are also associated with Parkinson's disease and psoriasis. These results suggest that PGLYRP3 protects humans from these diseases, and that mutations in PGLYRP3 gene are among the genetic factors predisposing to these diseases. PGLYRP3 variants are also associated with the composition of airway microbiome.

== See also ==
- Peptidoglycan recognition protein
- Peptidoglycan recognition protein 1
- Peptidoglycan recognition protein 2
- Peptidoglycan recognition protein 4
- Peptidoglycan
- Innate immune system
- Bacterial cell walls
