= Dan Hultmark =

Swedish biologist

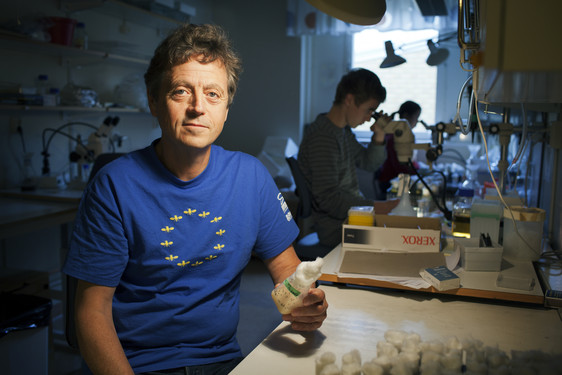
- Education: Stockholm University (PhD)
- Known for: work on innate immunity, molecular biology, genetics
- Awards: Royal Swedish Academy of Sciences Flormanska belöningen (1994); Göran Gustafssons stiftelse (1996); AAAS Fellow (2007)
- Scientific career
- Fields: Molecular Biology; Genetics; Bioinformatics

Dan Hultmark is a Swedish biologist currently Professor Emeritus, whose research focused on the mechanisms of innate immunity, using Drosophila as a model system, at Umeå University and an Elected Fellow of the American Association for the Advancement of Science. Hultmark is also a member of the Drosophila 12 Genomes Consortium, Tribolium Genome Sequencing Consortium.

== Awards and honors ==
Hultmark received the Flormanska belöningen of the Royal Swedish Academy of Sciences (1994) and the Göran Gustafsson Prize in Molecular Biology (1996). He is a Distinguished Fellow of the American Association for The Advancement of Science section of biological sciences since 2007. Between 2009 and 2013 Hultmark was invited by the Academy of Finland to the Institute of Medical Technology, University of Tampere as a Finland Distinguished Professor.

== Publications (selected) ==
=== Book ===
- Brey, Hultmark (Eds), Molecular mechanism of immune responses in insects London: Chapman & Hall, 1998. ISBN 9780412712807

=== Peer-reviewed journals ===
- Boman, HG; Hultmark, D (1987). "Cell-free immunity in insects". Annu. Rev. Microbiol. 41: 103–26. doi:10.1146/annurev.mi.41.100187.000535. PMID 3318666..
- Little, TJ; Hultmark, D; Read, AF (2005). "Invertebrate immunity and the limits of mechanistic immunology". Nat Immunol. 6 (7): 651–4. doi:10.1038/ni1219. PMID 15970937..
- Sackton, TB; Lazzaro, BP; Schlenke, TA; Evans, JD; Hultmark, D; Clark, AG (2007). "Dynamic evolution of the innate immune system in Drosophila". Nat Genet. 39 (12): 1461–8. doi:10.1038/ng.2007.60. PMID 17987029.
- Anderl, I; Hultmark, D (2015). "New ways to make a blood cell". eLife. 4 e06877. doi:10.7554/eLife.06877. PMC 4357284. PMID 25764304.
- Yang, H; Hultmark, D (2016). "Tissue communication in a systemic immune response of Drosophila". Fly (Austin). 10 (3): 115–22. doi:10.1080/19336934.2016.1182269. PMC 4970531. PMID 27116253.
- Yang, H; Hultmark, D (2017). "Drosophila muscles regulate the immune response against wasp infection via carbohydrate metabolism". Sci Rep. 7 15713. Bibcode:2017NatSR...715713Y. doi:10.1038/s41598-017-15940-2. PMC 5691183. PMID 29146985.
