= HSPBP1 =

Protein-coding gene in the species Homo sapiens

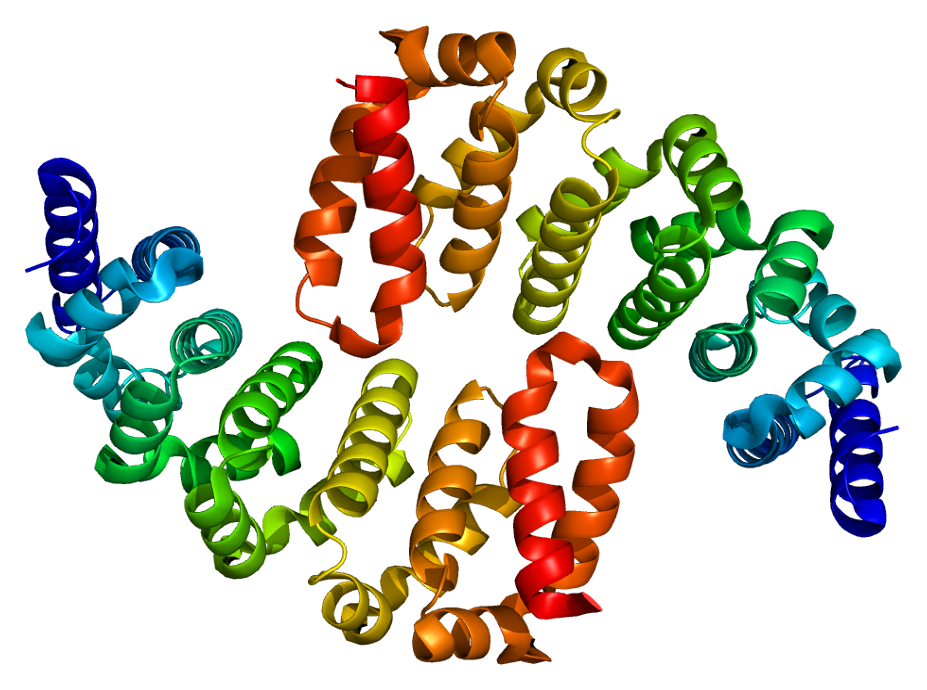

Identifiers
- Aliases: HSPBP1, FES1, HSPA (heat shock 70kDa) binding protein, cytoplasmic cochaperone 1, HSPA (Hsp70) binding protein 1
- External IDs: OMIM: 612939; MGI: 1913495; GeneCards: HSPBP1
Available structures
PDB	Ortholog search: PDBe RCSB
PDB	List of PDB id codes 1XQR, 1XQS

Gene location (Human)
Chr.	Chromosome 19 (human)
Band	19q13.42	Start	55,262,223 bp
Band	19q13.42	End	55,280,381 bp

Gene location (Mouse)
Chr.	Chromosome 7 (mouse)
Band	7|7 A1	Start	4,663,520 bp
Band	7|7 A1	End	4,688,067 bp
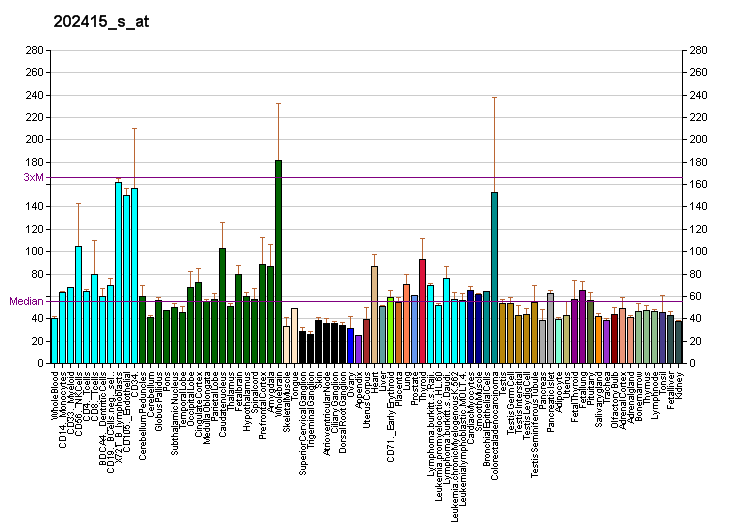
RNA expression pattern
Bgee	Human / Mouse (ortholog); Top expressed in: nucleus accumbens; right uterine tube; caudate nucleus; putamen; right frontal lobe; apex of heart; cingulate gyrus; anterior cingulate cortex; amygdala; mucosa of transverse colon / Top expressed in: spermatid; primary visual cortex; perirhinal cortex; right kidney; entorhinal cortex; superior frontal gyrus; morula; embryo; dentate gyrus of hippocampal formation granule cell; CA3 field; More reference expression data
BioGPS	More reference expression data
Gene ontology
Molecular function	enzyme inhibitor activity; protein binding; adenyl-nucleotide exchange factor activity; ubiquitin protein ligase binding
Cellular component	cytoplasm; endoplasmic reticulum
Biological process	positive regulation of protein ubiquitination; protein folding; positive regulation of proteasomal ubiquitin-dependent protein catabolic process; negative regulation of catalytic activity; regulation of catalytic activity
Sources:Amigo / QuickGO
Orthologs
Databases	NCBI: entry; OMA: entry
Species	Human	Mouse
Entrez	23640	66245
Ensembl	ENSG00000133265	ENSMUSG00000063802
UniProt	Q9NZL4	Q99P31
RefSeq (mRNA)	NM_001130106; NM_001297600; NM_012267	NM_024172; NM_001360629
RefSeq (protein)	NP_001123578; NP_001284529; NP_036399	NP_077134; NP_001347558
Location (UCSC)	Chr 19: 55.26 – 55.28 Mb	Chr 7: 4.66 – 4.69 Mb
PubMed search
- Wikidata
View/Edit Human	View/Edit Mouse

Hsp70-binding protein 1 is a protein that in humans is encoded by the HSPBP1 gene.

== Interactions ==
HSPBP1 has been shown to interact with HSPA8 and HSPA4.
