= S100A4 =

Protein found in humans

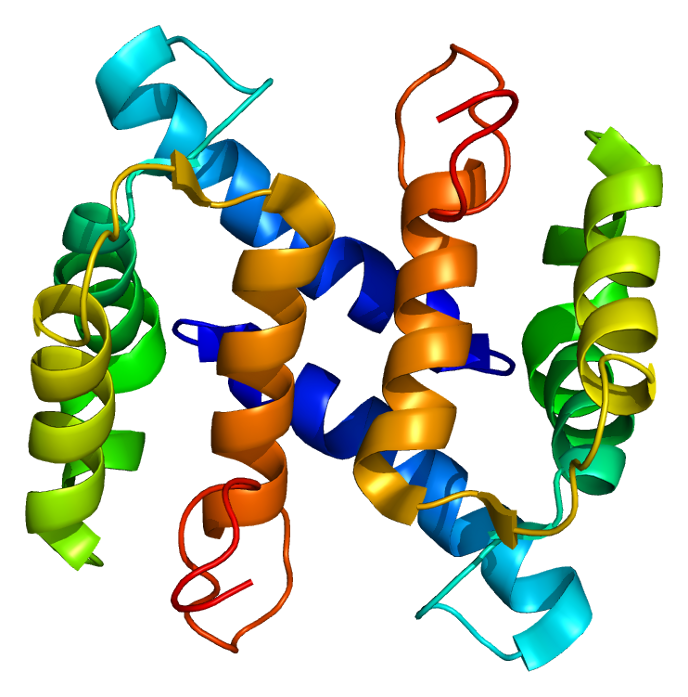

Identifiers
- Aliases: S100A4, 18A2, 42A, CAPL, FSP1, MTS1, P9KA, PEL98, S100 calcium binding protein A4
- External IDs: OMIM: 114210; MGI: 1330282; GeneCards: S100A4
Available structures
PDB	Ortholog search: PDBe RCSB
PDB	List of PDB id codes 1M31, 2LNK, 2MRD, 2Q91, 3C1V, 3CGA, 3KO0, 3M0W, 3ZWH, 4CFQ, 4CFR, 4ETO, 4HSZ

Gene location (Human)
Chr.	Chromosome 1 (human)
Band	1q21.3	Start	153,543,613 bp
Band	1q21.3	End	153,550,136 bp

Gene location (Mouse)
Chr.	Chromosome 3 (mouse)
Band	3 F1|3 39.27 cM	Start	90,511,078 bp
Band	3 F1|3 39.27 cM	End	90,513,352 bp
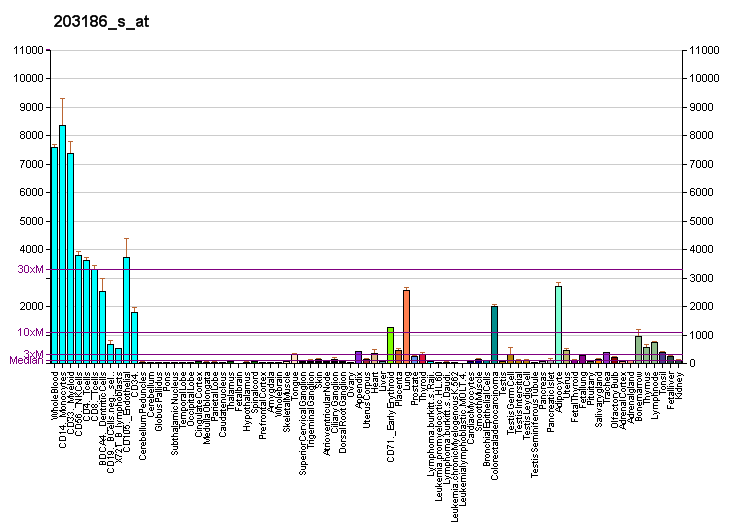
RNA expression pattern
Bgee	Human / Mouse (ortholog); Top expressed in: synovial joint; monocyte; granulocyte; palpebral conjunctiva; Descending thoracic aorta; saphenous vein; nasal epithelium; synovial membrane; ascending aorta; blood / Top expressed in: lip; lens; ovary; esophagus; zone of skin; urinary bladder; spleen; quadriceps femoris muscle; synovial joint; white adipose tissue; More reference expression data
BioGPS	More reference expression data
Gene ontology
Molecular function	calcium ion binding; actin binding; protein binding; calcium-dependent protein binding; metal ion binding; RAGE receptor binding; RNA binding; transition metal ion binding; identical protein binding
Cellular component	perinuclear region of cytoplasm; neuron projection; extracellular exosome; nucleus; extracellular space; extracellular region; collagen-containing extracellular matrix
Biological process	positive regulation of I-kappaB kinase/NF-kappaB signaling; epithelial to mesenchymal transition
Sources:Amigo / QuickGO
Orthologs
Databases	NCBI: entry; OMA: entry
Species	Human	Mouse
Entrez	6275	20198
Ensembl	ENSG00000196154	ENSMUSG00000001020
UniProt	P26447	P07091
RefSeq (mRNA)	NM_019554; NM_002961	NM_011311
RefSeq (protein)	NP_002952; NP_062427	NP_035441
Location (UCSC)	Chr 1: 153.54 – 153.55 Mb	Chr 3: 90.51 – 90.51 Mb
PubMed search
- Wikidata
View/Edit Human	View/Edit Mouse

Protein S100-A4 (S100A4) is a protein that in humans is encoded by the S100A4 gene.

== Function ==
The protein encoded by this gene is a member of the S100 family of proteins containing 2 EF-hand calcium-binding motifs. S100 proteins are localized in the cytoplasm and/or nucleus of a wide range of cells, and involved in the regulation of a number of cellular processes such as cell cycle progression and differentiation. S100 genes include at least 13 members which are located as a cluster on chromosome 1q21. This protein may function in motility, invasion, and tubulin polymerization. Chromosomal rearrangements and altered expression of this gene have been implicated in tumor metastasis. Multiple alternatively spliced variants, encoding the same protein, have been identified.

== Interactions ==
S100A4 has been shown to interact with S100 calcium binding protein A1.

== Therapeutic targeting for cancer ==
S100A4, a member of the S100 calcium-binding protein family secreted by tumor and stromal cells, supports tumorigenesis by stimulating angiogenesis. Research demonstrated that S100A4 synergizes with vascular endothelial growth factor (VEGF) via the RAGE receptor, in promoting endothelial cell migration by increasing KDR expression and MMP-9 activity. In vivo overexpression of S100A4 led to a significant increase in tumor growth and vascularization in a human melanoma xenograft M21 model. Conversely, when silencing S100A4 by shRNA technology, a dramatic decrease in tumor development of the pancreatic MIA PaCa-2 cell line was observed. Based on these results 5C3 was developed, a neutralizing monoclonal antibody against S100A4. This antibody abolished endothelial cell migration, tumor growth and angiogenesis in immunodeficient mouse xenograft models of MiaPACA-2 and M21-S100A4 cells. It is concluded that extracellular S100A4 inhibition is an attractive approach for the treatment of human cancer.

S100A4 is highly associated with components of the cytoskeleton and when this gene is upregulated, it changes the cell's morphology, making it more susceptible to invasion from proteins that contribute to metastasis, such as cathepsin B and cyclin B1. Together, these factors form polyploid giant cancer cells (PGCCs), which are highly proliferative and invasive. Experimental knockout therapy data have suggested that S100A4 exhibits a form of control over cathepsin B and cyclin B1, and that suppressing it can reduce the invasive capabilities of PGCCs and their daughter cells. Studies on invasive breast cancer have found that S100A4 plays a major role in high-density collagen deposition, which is one of the clinical symptoms of tumor metastasis. Significantly higher levels of S100A4 were found in samples that exhibited lymph node metastasis than in those that didn't, indicating that abnormal collagen deposition could be contributed to by S100A4. Not only does overexpression of S100A4 contribute to the formation of various cancers, but it also contributes to pathological factors associated with cancer and its progression.
