= N-acetylmuramoyl-L-alanine amidase =

Class of enzymes

Identifiers
- EC no.: 3.5.1.28
- CAS no.: 9013-25-6

Databases
- IntEnz: IntEnz view
- BRENDA: BRENDA entry
- ExPASy: NiceZyme view
- KEGG: KEGG entry
- MetaCyc: metabolic pathway
- PRIAM: profile
- PDB structures: RCSB PDB PDBe PDBsum
- Gene Ontology: AmiGO / QuickGO
Search
- PMC: articles
- PubMed: articles
- NCBI: proteins

Amidase_2
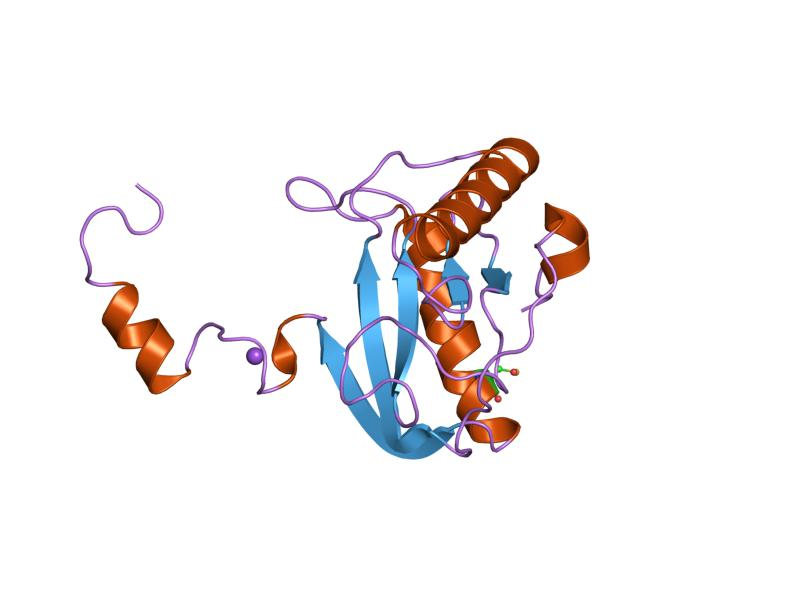
- crystal structure of the c-terminal peptidoglycan-binding domain of human peptidoglycan recognition protein ialpha

Identifiers
- Symbol: Amidase_2
- Pfam: PF01510
- InterPro: IPR002502
- SCOP2: 1lba / SCOPe / SUPFAM
Available protein structures:
- Pfam: structures / ECOD
- PDB: RCSB PDB; PDBe; PDBj
- PDBsum: structure summary

Amidase_3
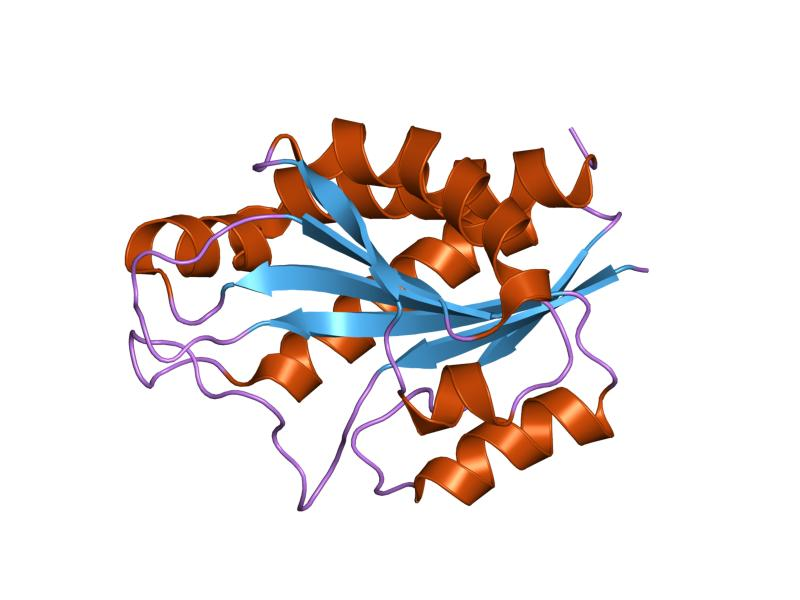
- structure of the catalytic domain of cwlv, n-acetylmuramoyl-l-alanine amidase from bacillus(paenibacillus) polymyxa var.colistinus

Identifiers
- Symbol: Amidase_3
- Pfam: PF01520
- Pfam clan: CL0035
- InterPro: IPR002508
- SCOP2: 1jwq / SCOPe / SUPFAM
Available protein structures:
- Pfam: structures / ECOD
- PDB: RCSB PDB; PDBe; PDBj
- PDBsum: structure summary

Amidase_5

Identifiers
- Symbol: Amidase_5
- Pfam: PF05382
- Pfam clan: CL0125
- InterPro: IPR008044
Available protein structures:
- Pfam: structures / ECOD
- PDB: RCSB PDB; PDBe; PDBj
- PDBsum: structure summary

Amidase02_C

Identifiers
- Symbol: Amidase02_C
- Pfam: PF12123
- InterPro: IPR021976
Available protein structures:
- Pfam: structures / ECOD
- PDB: RCSB PDB; PDBe; PDBj
- PDBsum: structure summary

In enzymology, a N-acetylmuramoyl-L-alanine amidase (EC 3.5.1.28) is an enzyme that catalyzes a chemical reaction that cleaves the link between N-acetylmuramoyl residues and L-amino acid residues in certain cell-wall glycopeptides.

This enzyme belongs to the family of hydrolases, specifically those acting on carbon-nitrogen bonds other than peptide bonds in linear amides. The systematic name of this enzyme class is peptidoglycan amidohydrolase. Other names in common use include acetylmuramyl-L-alanine amidase, N-acetylmuramyl-L-alanine amidase, N-acylmuramyl-L-alanine amidase, acetylmuramoyl-alanine amidase, N-acetylmuramic acid L-alanine amidase, acetylmuramyl-alanine amidase, N-acetylmuramylalanine amidase, N-acetylmuramoyl-L-alanine amidase type I, and N-acetylmuramoyl-L-alanine amidase type II. This enzyme participates in peptidoglycan biosynthesis. Autolysins and some phage lysins are examples of N-acetylmuramoyl-L-alanine amidases.

== See also ==
- Phage lysins
- Autolysins
- PGLYRP2
