= N-Acetylmuramic acid =

Chemical compound

Names
- IUPAC name N-Acetylmuramic acid
- Systematic IUPAC name (2R)-2-{[(2R,3R,4R,5R)-2-Acetamido-4,5,6-trihydroxy-1-oxohexan-3-yl]oxy}propanoic acid

Identifiers
CAS Number	10597-89-4
3D model (JSmol)	Interactive image
ChEBI	CHEBI:21615
ChemSpider	4575341
ECHA InfoCard	100.031.092
PubChem CID	5462244
UNII	246FXU111L
CompTox Dashboard (EPA)	DTXSID70893663
- InChI: InChI=1S/C11H19NO8/c1-4(10(16)17)19-9-7(12-5(2)14)11(18)20-6(3-13)8(9)15/h4,6-9,11,13,15,18H,3H2,1-2H3,(H,12,14)(H,16,17)/t4-,6-,7-,8-,9-,11?/m1/s1 Key: MNLRQHMNZILYPY-MKFCKLDKSA-N; InChI=1/C11H19NO8/c1-4(10(16)17)19-9-7(12-5(2)14)11(18)20-6(3-13)8(9)15/h4,6-9,11,13,15,18H,3H2,1-2H3,(H,12,14)(H,16,17)/t4-,6-,7-,8-,9-,11?/m1/s1 Key: MNLRQHMNZILYPY-MKFCKLDKBR
- SMILES: O=C(O)[C@H](O[C@H]1[C@H](O)[C@H](OC(O)[C@@H]1NC(=O)C)CO)C

Properties
Chemical formula	C_{11}H_{19}NO_{8}
Molar mass	293.272 g·mol^{−1}
- Except where otherwise noted, data are given for materials in their standard state (at 25 °C [77 °F], 100 kPa). verify (what is ?) Infobox references

N-Acetylmuramic acid (NAM or MurNAc) is an organic compound with the chemical formula C_{11}H_{19}NO_{8}. It is a monomer of peptidoglycan in most bacterial cell walls, which is built from alternating units of N-acetylglucosamine (GlcNAc) and N-acetylmuramic acid, cross-linked by oligopeptides at the lactic acid residue of MurNAc.

== Formation of NAM ==
NAM is an addition product of phosphoenolpyruvate and N-acetylglucosamine. This addition happens exclusively in the cell cytoplasm.

== Clinical significance ==
N-Acetylmuramic acid (MurNAc) is part of the peptidoglycan polymer of bacterial cell walls. MurNAc is covalently linked to N-acetylglucosamine and may also be linked through the hydroxyl on carbon number 4 to the carbon of L-alanine. A pentapeptide composed of L-alanyl-D-isoglutaminyl-L-lysyl-D-alanyl-D-alanine is added to the MurNAc in the process of making the peptidoglycan strands of the cell wall.

Synthesis of NAM is inhibited by fosfomycin.

NAG and NAM cross-linking can be inhibited by antibiotics to inhibit pathogens from growing within the body. Therefore, both NAG and NAM are valuable polymers in medicinal research.

== See also ==
- Amino sugar
- Glucosamine
- Muramic acid
