= Lipid II =

Chemical compound

Names
- Systematic IUPAC name (2R,5R,8S,13R,16S,19R)-19-{[(2R,3R,4R,5S,6R)-3-Acetamido-5-{[(2S,3R,4R,5S,6R)-3-acetamido-4,5-dihydroxy-6-(hydroxymethyl)oxan-2-yl]oxy}-2-[(1,3-dihydroxy-1,3-dioxo-3-{[(2Z,6Z,10Z,14Z,18Z,22Z,26Z,30Z,34E,38E,42E)-3,7,11,15,19,23,27,31,35,39,43-undecamethyltetratetraconta-2,6,10,14,18,22,26,30,34,38,42-undecaen-1-yl]oxy}-1λ^{5},3λ^{5}-diphosphoxan-1-yl)oxy]-6-(hydroxymethyl)oxan-4-yl]oxy}-8-(4-aminobutyl)-13-carboxy-2,5,16-trimethyl-4,7,10,15,18-pentaoxo-3,6,9,14,17-pentaazaicosan-1-oic acid

Identifiers
CAS Number	339578-22-2
3D model (JSmol)	Interactive image
Beilstein Reference	9039417
ChEBI	CHEBI:27692
ChemSpider	26333143
KEGG	C05893; G10553
PubChem CID	46173749
CompTox Dashboard (EPA)	DTXSID701032114
- InChI: InChI=1S/C94H156N8O26P2/c1-59(2)31-21-32-60(3)33-22-34-61(4)35-23-36-62(5)37-24-38-63(6)39-25-40-64(7)41-26-42-65(8)43-27-44-66(9)45-28-46-67(10)47-29-48-68(11)49-30-50-69(12)54-56-122-129(118,119)128-130(120,121)127-94-82(100-75(18)106)86(85(79(58-104)125-94)126-93-81(99-74(17)105)84(109)83(108)78(57-103)124-93)123-73(16)89(112)96-71(14)88(111)102-77(92(116)117)52-53-80(107)101-76(51-19-20-55-95)90(113)97-70(13)87(110)98-72(15)91(114)115/h31,33,35,37,39,41,43,45,47,49,54,70-73,76-79,81-86,93-94,103-104,108-109H,19-30,32,34,36,38,40,42,44,46,48,50-53,55-58,95H2,1-18H3,(H,96,112)(H,97,113)(H,98,110)(H,99,105)(H,100,106)(H,101,107)(H,102,111)(H,114,115)(H,116,117)(H,118,119)(H,120,121)/b60-33+,61-35+,62-37-,63-39-,64-41-,65-43-,66-45-,67-47-,68-49-,69-54-/t70-,71+,72-,73-,76+,77-,78-,79-,81-,82-,83-,84-,85-,86-,93+,94-/m1/s1 Key: ULXTYUPMJXVUHQ-OVTFQNCVSA-N
- SMILES: CC(C(=O)NC(CCC(=O)NC(CCCCN)C(=O)NC(C)C(=O)NC(C)C(=O)O)C(=O)O)NC(=O)C(C)OC1C(C(OC(C1OC2C(C(C(C(O2)CO)O)O)NC(=O)C)CO)OP(=O)(O)OP(=O)(O)OCC=C(C)CCC=C(C)CCC=C(C)CCC=C(C)CCC=C(C)CCC=C(C)CCC=C(C)CCC=C(C)CCC=C(C)CCC=C(C)CCC=C(C)C)NC(=O)C

Properties
Chemical formula	C_{94}H_{156}N_{8}O_{26}P_{2}
Molar mass	1876.23 g·mol^{−1}
- Except where otherwise noted, data are given for materials in their standard state (at 25 °C [77 °F], 100 kPa). Infobox references

Lipid II is a precursor molecule in the synthesis of the cell wall of bacteria. It is a peptidoglycan, which is amphipathic and named for its bactoprenol hydrocarbon chain, which acts as a lipid anchor, embedding itself in the bacterial cell membrane. Lipid II must translocate across the cell membrane to deliver and incorporate its disaccharide-pentapeptide "building block" into the peptidoglycan mesh. Lipid II is the target of several antibiotics.

== Synthesis ==
=== In peptidoglycan biosynthetic pathway ===
Lipid II is the final intermediate in peptidoglycan synthesis. It is formed when the MurG transferase catalyzes addition of N-acetylglucosamine (GlcNAc) to Lipid I, resulting in a complete disaccharide-pentapeptide monomer with a bactoprenol-pyrophosphate anchor. This occurs on the inside of the cytoplasmic membrane, where the bactoprenol chain is embedded in the inner leaflet of the bilayer. Lipid II is then transported across the membrane by a flippase, to expose the disaccharide-pentapeptide monomer, which is the pentapeptide stem consisting of L-Ala-γ-D-Glu-m-DAP-D-Ala-D-Ala between GlcNAc and N-acetylmuramic acid (MurNAc), for polymerization and cross-linking into peptidoglycan. The remaining bactoprenol-pyrophosphate is then recycled to the interior of the membrane.

The essential MurJ flippase, which translocates lipid II across the cytoplasmic membrane, was only published in July 2014, after decades of searching. The discovery remained somewhat controversial as assay results were conflicting; FtsW (EC 2.4.1.129) was proposed as an alternative, but evidence has strongly favored the MurJ side since 2019.

=== Artificial production ===
A method for artificial production of lipid II has been described. For synthesis of lipid II from UDP-MurNAc pentapeptide and undecaprenol, the enzymes MraY, MurG, and undecaprenol kinase can be used. Synthetic Lipid II analogues are used in experiments studying how it interacts with and binds molecules. Significant quantities of the important peptidoglycan precursor have also been isolated, following accumulation in bacterial cells.

== Functions ==
Lipid II acts as a "shuttle carrier" of peptidoglycan building blocks in many bacteria by translocating across the cell membrane to deliver and incorporate its disaccharide-pentapeptide. Polymers of lipid II form a linear glycan chain, catalyzed by the glycosyltransferases of family 51 (GT51). Transpeptidases cross link the chains and form a net-like peptidoglycan macromolecule. The resulting glycopeptide is an essential part of the envelope of many bacteria, estimated to exist at a concentration of less than 2000 molecules per bacterial cell.

Lipid II biosynthesis is functional and essential even in organisms without a cell wall like Chlamydia and Wolbachia. It has been hypothesized that maintaining lipid II biosynthesis reflects its role in prokaryotic cell division.

In the discovery and mechanism of assembly of pili in gram positive bacteria Lipid II has been implicated as a crucial structural molecule. It anchors the pili during or after polymerization of the pilus components.

== Antibiotics ==
Since Lipid II must be flipped outside the cytoplasmic membrane before incorporation of its disaccharide-peptide unit into peptidoglycan, it is a relatively accessible target for antibiotics. These antibiotics fight bacteria by either directly inhibiting the peptidoglycan synthesis, or by binding to lipid II to form destructive pores in the cytoplasmic membrane. Examples of antibiotics that target Lipid II include:

- Vancomycin and its synthetic derivatives
- Ramoplanin
- Several lantibiotics, including the common food preservative nisin
- Teixobactin
- Copsin
- Human alpha defensins

=== Binding ===
The D-Ala-D-Ala terminus is used by glycopeptide antibiotic vancomycin to inhibit lipid I- and lipid II-consuming peptidoglycan synthesis; in vancomycin-resistant strains vancomycin cannot bind, because a crucial hydrogen bond is lost. Oritavancin also uses the D-Ala-D-Ala terminus, but in addition it uses the crossbridge and D-iso-glutamine in position 2 of the lipid II stem peptide, as present in a number of Gram-positive pathogens, like staphylococci and enterococci. The increased binding of oritavancin through amidation of lipid II can compensate for the loss of a crucial hydrogen bond in vancomycin-resistant strains,

Lantibiotics recognize lipid-II by its pyrophosphate.

Lipid II interacts with human alpha defensins, a class of antimicrobial peptides, such as Defensin, alpha 1. The latter has been used to describe and predict binding of synthetic low-molecular weight compounds created as possible therapeutic agents in treating of Gram-positive infections.

Penicillin-binding protein 4 exchanges d-amino acids into Lipid II (and Lipid I), acting as a transpeptidase in vitro.
