= MP196 =

Chemical compound

Identifiers
- CAS Number: 359632-11-4
- PubChem CID: 171041446
- ChemSpider: 8571746
- CompTox Dashboard (EPA): DTXSID801337357

Chemical and physical data
- Formula: C_{51}H_{69}N_{19}O_{6}
- Molar mass: 1044.240 g·mol^{−1}
- 3D model (JSmol): Interactive image
- SMILES: C1=CC=C2C(=C1)C(=CN2)C[C@@H](C(=O)N)NC(=O)[C@H](CCCNC(=N)N)NC(=O)[C@H](CC3=CNC4=CC=CC=C43)NC(=O)[C@H](CCCNC(=N)N)NC(=O)[C@H](CC5=CNC6=CC=CC=C65)NC(=O)[C@H](CCCNC(=N)N)N
- InChI: InChI=1S/C51H69N19O6/c52-34(13-7-19-60-49(54)55)44(72)69-41(23-29-26-64-36-15-5-2-11-32(29)36)47(75)67-39(18-9-21-62-51(58)59)46(74)70-42(24-30-27-65-37-16-6-3-12-33(30)37)48(76)66-38(17-8-20-61-50(56)57)45(73)68-40(43(53)71)22-28-25-63-35-14-4-1-10-31(28)35/h1-6,10-12,14-16,25-27,34,38-42,63-65H,7-9,13,17-24,52H2,(H2,53,71)(H,66,76)(H,67,75)(H,68,73)(H,69,72)(H,70,74)(H4,54,55,60)(H4,56,57,61)(H4,58,59,62)/t34-,38-,39-,40-,41-,42-/m0/s1; Key:DFJJRDKPFYRDNH-XLAHBAAGSA-N

MP196 is a synthetic antimicrobial peptide. It falls under the structural class: short cationic peptides. Since it is a short cationic peptide, it can be easily synthesized, derivatized and isolated. MP196 is rich in tryptophan, a hydrophobic amino acid and arginine residues, a positively charged amino acid. It has structure: RWRWRW-NH2. This a short linear peptide with minimal pharmacophore. MP196 is effective against gram-positive bacteria and moderately effective against gram-negative bacteria.

MP196 incorporates into the bacterial cytoplasmic cell membrane to bring about bacterial cell death. Differential scanning calorimetry results have shown that MP196 prefers incorporation into bacterial cell membranes over erythrocyte membranes, as this cationic peptide prefers incorporating into membranes which have a higher negatively charged phospholipid ratio. Erythrocytes are made up of neutral phospholipid, thus explaining why MP196 does not get incorporated into its membrane, because MP196 prefers negatively charged cytoplasmic membranes, it has a low hemolytic activity, and thus has low toxicity against humans.

Incorporation of MP196 into the cell membrane causes detachment of cytochrome C and MurG proteins from the membrane. Cytochrome C is a protein involved in the bacterial respiratory chain and MurG is an enzyme involved in the bacterial cell wall biosynthesis pathway. These detachments, in turn, lead to limited cellular energy through the drop in the level of ATP and it undermines the cell wall integrity. Additionally, MP196 leads to osmotic destabilization in bacterial cells. These factors lead to bacterial cell death. MP196 does not need to be stereospecific to bring about bacterial cell death. MP196 was equally effective when synthesized with all D amino acids or all L amino acids.

MP196 is shown to be effective against some strains of methicillin-resistant Staphylococcus aureus (MRSA) and vancomycin intermediate-resistant Staphylococcus aureus (VISA). MP196 brings about bacterial cell death through a wide variety of mechanisms, thus making it difficult for the bacteria to develop resistance. MP196 can be used as the key structure in order to develop any potential antimicrobial peptides which could help in fighting back against antibiotic-resistant bacteria.
