= Undecaprenyl-diphosphatase =

Class of enzymes

undecaprenyl-diphosphatase

Identifiers
- EC no.: 3.6.1.27
- CAS no.: 9077-80-9

Databases
- BRENDA: enzyme data
- ExPASy: NiceZyme view
- KEGG: enzyme entry
- MetaCyc: metabolic pathway
- Rhea: reactions
- PDB structures: RCSB PDB PDBe PDBsum
- Gene Ontology: AmiGO / QuickGO
Search
- PMC: articles
- PubMed: articles
- NCBI: proteins

Bacitracin resistance protein

Identifiers
- Symbol: ?
- Pfam: PF02673
- InterPro: IPR003824
- OPM superfamily: 479
- OPM protein: 5oon
Available protein structures:
- PDB: IPR003824 PF02673 (ECOD; PDBsum)
- AlphaFold: IPR003824; PF02673

In enzymology, an undecaprenyl-diphosphatase (EC 3.6.1.27) is an enzyme that catalyzes the chemical reaction

undecaprenyl diphosphate + H_{2}O $\rightleftharpoons$ undecaprenyl phosphate + phosphate

Thus, the two substrates of this enzyme are undecaprenyl diphosphate and H_{2}O, whereas its two products are undecaprenyl phosphate and phosphate. The enzymatic activity is enhanced by divalent cations, particularly Ca^{2+}.

In many bacteria, this enzyme is a membrane protein that participates in peptidoglycan biosynthesis. The enzyme has been implicated in conferring resistance to the antibiotic bacitracin.

== Nomenclature ==
This enzyme belongs to the family of hydrolases, specifically those acting on acid anhydrides in phosphorus-containing anhydrides. The systematic name of this enzyme class is undecaprenyl-diphosphate phosphohydrolase. Other names in common use include Undecaprenyl-pyrophosphate phosphatase (Uppp), UPP phosphatase, BacA, C55-isoprenyl diphosphatase, C55-isoprenyl pyrophosphatase, and isoprenyl pyrophosphatase.

Note: The enzyme Uppp/BacA (EC 3.6.1.27) has occasionally been incorrectly termed an "undecaprenol kinase". However, that name should be reserved for a distinct enzyme (EC 2.7.1.66), which catalyses the addition of a phosphate group from ATP to undecaprenol (C55-isoprenyl alcohol).

== Structure ==
X-ray crystal structures of the membrane-form of the enzyme from E. coli are available (PDB IDs: 5OON, 6CB2).
