= Lipid II:glycine glycyltransferase =

Identifiers
- EC no.: 2.3.2.16

Databases
- IntEnz: IntEnz view
- BRENDA: BRENDA entry
- ExPASy: NiceZyme view
- KEGG: KEGG entry
- MetaCyc: metabolic pathway
- PRIAM: profile
- PDB structures: RCSB PDB PDBe PDBsum
Search
- PMC: articles
- PubMed: articles
- NCBI: proteins

Lipid II:glycine glycyltransferase (EC 2.3.2.16, N-acetylmuramoyl-L-alanyl-D-glutamyl-L-lysyl-D-alanyl-D-alanine-diphosphoundecaprenyl-N-acetylglucosamine:N^{6}-glycine transferase, femX (gene)) is an enzyme with systematic name alanyl-D-alanine-diphospho-ditrans, octacis-undecaprenyl-N-acetylglucosamine:glycine N^{6}-glycyltransferase. This enzyme catalyses the following chemical reaction

N-acetylmuramoyl-L-alanyl-D-isoglutaminyl-L-lysyl-D-alanyl-D-alanine-diphospho-ditrans,octacis-undecaprenyl-N-acetylglucosamine + glycyl-tRNA $\rightleftharpoons$ N-acetylmuramoyl-L-alanyl-D-isoglutaminyl-L-lysyl-(N^{6}-glycyl)-D-alanyl-D-alanine-diphospho-ditrans,octacis-undecaprenyl-N-acetylglucosamine + tRNA

The enzyme from Staphylococcus aureus catalyses the transfer of glycine from a charged tRNA to lipid II or N-acetylmuramoyl-L-alanyl-D-isoglutaminyl-L-lysyl-D-alanyl-D-alanine-diphosphoundecaprenyl-N-acetylglucosamine.
