= Polypeptide antibiotic =

Class of antibiotics

- Drug class
- Bacitracin, a polypeptide antibiotic derived from Bacillus subtilis.

Class identifiers
- Use: Various
- ATC code: D06A
- Biological target: Cell Wall, Peptidoglycan
- Chemical class: Polypeptides

Clinical data
- Drugs.com: Drug Classes

Legal status

Polypeptide antibiotics are a chemically diverse class of anti-infective and antitumor antibiotics containing non-protein polypeptide chains. Examples of this class include actinomycin, bacitracin, colistin, and polymyxin B. Actinomycin-D has found use in cancer chemotherapy. Most other polypeptide antibiotics are too toxic for systemic administration, but can safely be administered topically to the skin as an antiseptic for shallow cuts and abrasions.

Actinomycin-D is believed to produce its cytotoxic effects by binding DNA and inhibiting RNA synthesis. Other polypeptide antibiotics are thought to act by permeabilizing the bacterial cell membrane, but the details are largely unknown.

Animal studies have shown that actinomycin-D is corrosive to skin, irritating to the eyes and mucous membranes of the respiratory tract, and highly toxic by the oral route. It has also been shown to be carcinogenic, mutagenic, embryotoxic and teratogenic. Adverse effects of other polypeptide antibiotics include kidney and nerve damage when given by injection.

Polypeptide antibiotics are produced by all living organisms; largely by bacteria and generally function as natural host defence, presenting new medicinal opportunities. These antibiotics act via permeabilising the bacterial cell membrane, or neutralising its toxicity to cause cell death in bacteria. Its predominant clinical use is as a topical medication, however successful laboratory trials are limited. A common polypeptide antibiotic is bacitracin, derived from the bacteria Bacillus licheniformis. As a therapeutic drug, it has minimal harmful effects and low toxicity, however side effects in patients may include minor skin irritation and anaphylaxis in severe cases.

The development of new polypeptide antibiotics are used as an alternative drug therapy for patients with resistance to more commonly used medications. However further research is required to support the safety of use, and the biological response of the human body to polypeptide antibiotics.

== History ==
In 1947, polymyxins, the first antibiotic polypeptides were discovered, produced by the bacterium Paenibacillus polymyxa. The first clinical use of polymyxins was in 1959, with its compound polymyxin E; more commonly known as colistin. Colistin was not put through drug safety procedures that are now implemented by drug-regulation organisations, such as the Food and Drug Administration (FDA). As a result of new safety procedures, during the 1960s classes of polymyxins including colistin, became less popular due to the discovery of their toxic natures. The re-emergence of colistin use began in the late 1980s, via intravenous injection (IV) methods or inhalation to manage bacterial infections for which no other options are available, such as those caused by P. aeruginosa.

Polypeptide antibiotics target bacterial cell membranes, more specifically prevents the transport of peptidoglycan precursors synthesised in the cytoplasm, to components that have a major function in the growth of bacteria cell walls. This inhibition causes the permeability of the cell envelope to increase, cell contents leakage, and eventually cell death. The ability for polypeptide antibiotics to inhibit bacterial cell wall growth and thus bacterial replication, is a main factor in the approach to develop new antibacterial drugs.

== Medical use ==
=== Bacitracin ===
Bacitracin is a polypeptide antibiotic derived from a bacterium, Bacillus subtilis, and acts against bacteria through the inhibition of cell wall synthesis. It does this by inhibiting the removal of phosphate from lipid compounds, thus deactivating its function to transport peptidoglycan; the main component of bacterial cell membranes, to the microbial cell wall.

Bacitracin has been used in clinical practice mainly as a topical medication due to its toxicity being too high for parental use, however evidence successful treatment in clinical trials is limited. Surgeons are able to use Bacitracin in skin grafting procedures, due to its non-toxic quality. Pseudomembranous colitis; the inflammation of the large intestine was successfully treated with Bacitracin as an oral treatment, in the case of the two patients having relapses of the infection and allergic reactions, respectively, to the common antibiotic treatment with vancomycin. In 1980, the use of oral bacitracin successfully treated four cases of colitis and diarrhea associated with antibiotic use, caused by the bacteria Clostridioides difficile. However, two of the patients relapsed, whilst the other two cases experienced early stages of relapse. One relapsed patient was subsequently treated successfully with vancomycin. Bacitracin was also trialled in bullous impetigo, an acute blistering infection, however produced ineffective results with no significant difference in success rate in comparison to the placebo trials. Patients who continued to have new development of lesions further required alternative drug therapy, in a study undertaken by Ruby and Nelson, 1973. As a result, further studies of Bacitracin treatment in Impetigo, and to compare vancomycin and bacitracin are required.

=== Polymyxins ===
Polymyxins are a class of polypeptide antibiotics that act on bacteria via disrupting the transport mechanism of the cell wall. The application of polymyxin to treat serious cases of infections caused by Pseudomonas aeruginosa strains is rare. It is used when the patient has developed resistance to less toxic and more commonly used antibiotics, in this case are aminoglycosides and antipseudomonal penicillins. Polymyxins are also distributed as an inhaled medication to treat minor respiratory tract infections due to Pseudomonas, such as cystic fibrosis. More commonly, polymyxin is distributed as a topical medication for patients with superficial infections, such as infected varicose ulcers.

Polymyxin E, also referred to as colistin, is one of the few polypeptide antibiotics able to be systematically absorbed via oral consumption. It is used to treat leukaemia patients who have low levels of white blood cells. With use, non-toxic side effects of casts and azotaemia in the urine are observed in most patients.

=== Bleomycin ===
Bleomycin is a polypeptide (more specifically a glycopeptide) antibiotic derived from a bacterium, Streptomyces verticillus. Its mechanism of action involves bleomycin binding to guanine bases in deoxyribonucleic acid (DNA) with the oxidation of ferrous iron to ferric iron. The oxidation donates an electron that the oxygen accepts to form a reactive species of oxygen. The reactive oxygen entities attack DNA bases which store information, and thus inhibits DNA synthesis. Bleomycin also acts via interfering with cell wall synthesis in the target bacteria, however the exact mechanism of action is undetermined.

Bleomycin's medical application is as an anti-tumour drug mainly in germinative tumours and Hodgkin's lymphoma, however its use is limited by pulmonary toxicity. In a study of combining bleomycin and other medicinal agents in bladder cancer cells, results showed bleomycin induced DNA damage to all the cell lines tested. Thus, bleomycin as a combination therapy may be an option to treat tumours. Efficacy rates of bleomycin in conjunction with cisplatin and etoposide in testicular cancer is approximately 90% successful. Bleomycin also does not induce myelosuppression with decreased bone marrow activity, or immunosuppression; suppressing the immune responses in patients unlike alternative cytotoxic drugs. However, further trials are required as pulmonary toxicity occurs in approximately 10% of patients, with around 1% cases of death due to pulmonary fibrosis.

== Resistance ==
Polypeptide antibiotics are able to exhibit resistance, with various resistance patterns occurring amongst closely related species of bacteria, and in some cases, present on different strains of the same species. The development of resistance is result of the bacteria mutating in response to the use of these medicines, for example resistance via blocking the site of action so it cannot act against the function of the bacteria. This method of resistance occurrence may account for the inability for polypeptide antibiotics to act on gram-negative bacterium i.e. bacteria with thin peptidoglycan layers, where cases of changes of growth medium produced changes in the outer membrane.

Polypeptide antibiotic resistance eliminates the drug's effectiveness, thus allowing the bacteria to survive, replicate and continue harming to the patient. However, resistance rarely occurs in polypeptide antibiotics such as Bacitracin, although there have been cases seen in Staphylococcus aureus. This is an issue in patients with common infections that were previously able to be treated with antibiotics. As a result, the infection is difficult or unable to be cured, and in serious cases may lead to severe disabilities or death.

Bacteria when grown and replicated in concentrations under toxic levels do not develop secondary resistance; in which patients initially respond to the antibiotic, but subsequently develop resistance. This may factor in the ability for polypeptide antibiotics to survive in nature, and allow for the development of new antibiotics to regulate resistance of drugs and other classes of antibiotics.

With the increase in cases of drug resistance to conventional medications, the development of new alternative drugs such as polypeptide antibiotics is required. The ability for polypeptide to overcome resistance in most cases, stems from their mechanism of action to inhibit cell wall synthesis, and thus prevent the multiplication of bacterial cells before resistance is able to develop.

== Adverse effects ==
Polypeptide antibiotic use may result in minor side effects, and in rare cases, cause severe and possibly chronic adverse effects, predominantly when administered via intramuscular injection. Clinical trials and studies with polypeptide antibiotic use during pregnancy are limited, and have produced no definite conclusions of risk to the foetus. However, use of bacitracin as a topical or ophthalmic medication is considered relatively safe during breastfeeding, due to the skin's low absorption rate of chemicals.

Bacitracin has minimal adverse effects and relatively low toxicity. Side effects such as minor skin irritation, fever and nausea are present in some instances. However, cases of anaphylaxis; a severe allergic reaction which can potentially lead to death, have been reported after multiple uses of topical bacitracin on lesions in patients. Bacitracin use as an irrigation solution and topical bacitracin use after rhinoplasty procedures have also produced rare cases of anaphylaxis.

Use of polymyxins may cause nephrotoxicity and neuropathy; damage to the kidney via systemic use of drugs or toxins, and nerve damage that can cause pain, numbness and weakness respectively. Colistin is considered to have high toxicity, mainly having renal and neurological effects, including but not limited to decreased urine secretion, increased urea nitrogen concentrations in the blood and acute tubular necrosis. This is the result of Colistin removal via renal excretion, thus renal function should be monitored. Neurological effects are more common to develop in children, causing weakness, lethargy, confusion and respiratory paralysis.

Bleomycin use causes side effects ranging from nausea, vomiting, anorexia and fevers, to fatal pulmonary toxicity in 1–2% of cases resulting in death. More commonly, skin reactions occur including erythema or redness of the skin, hyperpigmentation with darker patches of skin, and the presence or formation of vesicles. Immediately after administration, bleomycin can also cause fever chills and hypotension or low blood pressure. However, the main limiting factor or bleomycin use is pulmonary toxicity. Reactive oxygen species produced via the redox reactions that occur due to its mechanism of action involving binding to guanine bases in DNA, which results in reduced membrane stability. These oxidants can cause lung inflammation and damage alveolar epithelial cells, resulting in the release of cytokines and growth factors that stimulate the rapid myofibroblast growth; cells between a fibroblast and a smooth muscle cell, as well as the secretion of a pathologic extracellular matrix where cells migrate, proliferate and differentiate, thus leading to fibrosis.

== Future research ==
Despite multiple research articles on polypeptide antibiotics, the understanding of their exact mechanism of action and the extent of their toxicity and effects remain unknown. Most investigations conclude they act via lysing cell membranes, however whether they act independently or coupled with other factors is undetermined.

Evidence for low toxicity and harmful effects is limited, requiring further research to address the safe use to polypeptides antibiotics. Colistin was developed before drug-safety procedure requirements were instigated by organisations such as the Food and Drug Administration (FDA). Thus clinical trials and studies of the movement of the drug through the body and the body's biological response to antibiotic polypeptide were not established to the current set standards.

Optimal dosages for Polymyxins have been studied, however produced definitive conclusions caused by design limitations of the study and an insufficient amount of clinical trials carried out. Although, polymyxin use as a combination therapy with other therapeutic agents is an option for further study, and considered relatively safe as an alternative drug therapy to antibiotics.

Areas for research on bleomycin include documenting the toxicity that occurs in roughly 10% of cases. Pulmonary toxicity is affected by age and dosage, and is more commonly developed in patients over 70 years and in cases with higher dosages. However, this set age isn't definite and toxicity is unpredictable; occasionally occurring in young patients with low accumulative doses, thus future studies aim to maximise efficacy and minimise toxic effects. Investigations on identification of patients with pulmonary toxicity caused by bleomycin are also incomplete, as other common syndromes observed in cancer patients produce visually similar X-rays.

Future research targets the increased emergence of resistance to antibacterial drugs, via the development polypeptide antibiotics as alternative drug therapies. This development involves expanding polypeptide antibiotic diversity and optimising function, whilst reducing toxic affects.

The ability for antibiotic polypeptides to overcome the challenge of bacteria developing resistance in most cases, is derived from their inhibition of cell wall synthesis and thus bacterial cell replication. However, whilst this acts against bacteria during multiplication, microbes generally exist outside of replication. Thus producing a new challenge, and providing an area for potential future research on polypeptide antibiotic mechanism of actions and how to manipulate them.
