= Pasta (disambiguation) =

Pasta is a generic term for foods made from an unleavened dough of flour and water, and sometimes a combination of egg and flour.

Pasta may also refer to:

== People ==
=== First name ===
- Pasta Dioguardi, an Argentine film and TV actor

=== Last name ===
- Giuditta Pasta, 19th century opera singer
- John Pasta, a computer scientist

=== Nickname ===
- David Pastrňák (born 1996), Czech ice hockey player

== Arts, entertainment, and media ==
- Pasta (TV series), a 2010 South Korean drama series
- Pasta ZZ, a Serbian new wave band
- "Pasta (song)", a 2019 song by Angie McMahon
- Pizza Pasta, a character in the video game Punch-Out!! series
- "Pasta" (The Bear), a 2023 episode of The Bear TV series

== Other uses ==
- Arrival theorem (known as the PASTA property), the mathematics of some stochastic processes (e.g., Poisson Arrivals see Time Averages)
- PASTA domain, a region of certain penicillin binding proteins
- Pasta filata, a technique in the manufacture of a family of Italian cheeses
- PASTA method, a computer security threat modeling framework
- Nuclear pasta, forms of matter hypothesized to exist in the crust of neutron stars
- S.S. Felice Scandone, an Italian basketball club known from 1996-97 as Pasta Baronia Avellino
