= UPPP =

UPPP may refer to:

- Undecaprenyl-diphosphatase, an enzyme
- Uvulopalatopharyngoplasty, a surgical procedure
