= Undecaprenyl-phosphate galactose phosphotransferase =

Class of enzymes

undecaprenyl-phosphate galactose phosphotransferase

Identifiers
- EC no.: 2.7.8.6
- CAS no.: 37278-29-8

Databases
- IntEnz: IntEnz view
- BRENDA: BRENDA entry
- ExPASy: NiceZyme view
- KEGG: KEGG entry
- MetaCyc: metabolic pathway
- PRIAM: profile
- PDB structures: RCSB PDB PDBe PDBsum
- Gene Ontology: AmiGO / QuickGO
Search
- PMC: articles
- PubMed: articles
- NCBI: proteins

In enzymology, an undecaprenyl-phosphate galactose phosphotransferase (EC 2.7.8.6) is an enzyme that catalyzes the chemical reaction

UDP-galactose + undecaprenyl phosphate $\rightleftharpoons$ UMP + alpha-D-galactosyl-diphosphoundecaprenol

Thus, the two substrates of this enzyme are UDP-galactose and undecaprenyl phosphate, whereas its two products are UMP and alpha-D-galactosyl-diphosphoundecaprenol.

This enzyme belongs to the family of transferases, specifically those transferring non-standard substituted phosphate groups. The systematic name of this enzyme class is UDP-galactose:undecaprenyl-phosphate galactose phosphotransferase. Other names in common use include poly(isoprenol)-phosphate galactose phosphotransferase, poly(isoprenyl)phosphate galactosephosphatetransferase, and undecaprenyl phosphate galactosyl-1-phosphate transferase.
