= MurE synthetase =

MurE synthetase may refer to:

- D-alanine—D-alanine ligase, an enzyme
- UDP-N-acetylmuramoylalanyl-D-glutamate-2,6-diamino-pimelate ligase, an enzyme
