= Di-trans,poly-cis-decaprenylcistransferase =

Class of enzymes

di-trans,poly-cis-decaprenylcistransferase

Identifiers
- EC no.: 2.5.1.31
- CAS no.: 52350-87-5

Databases
- IntEnz: IntEnz view
- BRENDA: BRENDA entry
- ExPASy: NiceZyme view
- KEGG: KEGG entry
- MetaCyc: metabolic pathway
- PRIAM: profile
- PDB structures: RCSB PDB PDBe PDBsum
- Gene Ontology: AmiGO / QuickGO
Search
- PMC: articles
- PubMed: articles
- NCBI: proteins

In enzymology, a di-trans,poly-cis-decaprenylcistransferase (EC 2.5.1.31) is an enzyme that catalyzes the chemical reaction

di-trans,poly-cis-decaprenyl diphosphate + isopentenyl diphosphate $\rightleftharpoons$ diphosphate + di-trans,poly-cis-undecaprenyl diphosphate

Thus, the two substrates of this enzyme are di-trans,poly-cis-decaprenyl diphosphate and isopentenyl diphosphate, whereas its two products are diphosphate and di-trans,poly-cis-undecaprenyl diphosphate.

This enzyme belongs to the family of transferases, specifically those transferring aryl or alkyl groups other than methyl groups. The systematic name of this enzyme class is di-trans,poly-cis-decaprenyl-diphosphate:isopentenyl-diphosphate undecaprenylcistransferase. Other names in common use include di-trans,poly-cis-undecaprenyl-diphosphate synthase, undecaprenyl-diphosphate synthase, bactoprenyl-diphosphate synthase, UPP synthetase, undecaprenyl diphosphate synthetase, and undecaprenyl pyrophosphate synthetase. This enzyme participates in terpenoid biosynthesis.

== Structural studies ==
As of late 2007, 15 structures have been solved for this class of enzymes, with PDB accession codes 1F75, 1JP3, 1UEH, 1V7U, 1X06, 1X07, 1X08, 1X09, 2D2R, 2DTN, 2E98, 2E99, 2E9A, 2E9C, and 2E9D.
