= Peptidoglycan glycosyltransferase =

Class of enzymes

peptidoglycan glycosyltransferase

Identifiers
- EC no.: 2.4.1.129
- CAS no.: 79079-04-2

Databases
- BRENDA: enzyme data
- ExPASy: NiceZyme view
- KEGG: enzyme entry
- MetaCyc: metabolic pathway
- Rhea: reactions
- PDB structures: RCSB PDB PDBe PDBsum
- Gene Ontology: AmiGO / QuickGO
Search
- PMC: articles
- PubMed: articles
- NCBI: proteins

Peptidoglycan glycosyltransferase (EC 2.4.1.129) is an enzyme used in the biosynthesis of peptidoglycan. It transfers a disaccharide-peptide from a donor substrate to synthesize a glycan chain.

This enzyme belongs to the family of glycosyltransferases, specifically the hexosyltransferases. The systematic name of this enzyme class is undecaprenyldiphospho-(N-acetyl-D-glucosaminyl-(1->4)-(N-acetyl-D-mu ramoylpentapeptide):undecaprenyldiphospho-(N-acetyl-D-glucosaminyl-( 1->4)-N-acetyl-D-muramoylpentapeptide) disaccharidetransferase. Other names in common use include PG-II, bactoprenyldiphospho-N-acetylmuramoyl-(N-acetyl-D-glucosaminyl)-, pentapeptide:peptidoglycan, N-acetylmuramoyl-N-acetyl-D-glucosaminyltransferase, penicillin binding protein (3 or 1B), and peptidoglycan transglycosylase.

== Function ==
Peptidoglycan glycosyltransferase couples Lipid II subunits to synthesize the peptidoglycan chains. Transpeptidases crosslink the carbohydrate chains to provide the framework for the cell wall.

It catalyzes the chemical reaction

[GlcNAc-(1->4)-Mur_{2}Ac(oyl-L-Ala-gamma-D-Glu-L-Lys-D-Ala-D-Ala)]n-diphosphoundecaprenol + GlcNAc-(1->4)-Mur_{2}Ac(oyl-L-Ala-gamma-D-Glu-L-Lys-D-Ala-D-Ala)-diphosphoundecaprenol
⇌
[GlcNAc-(1->4)-Mur_{2}Ac(oyl-L-Ala-gamma-D-Glu-L-Lys-D-Ala-D-Ala)]n^{+}1- diphosphoundecaprenol + undecaprenyl diphosphate

The 2 substrates of this enzyme are

- [GlcNAc-(1->4)-Mur2Ac(oyl-L-Ala-gamma-D-Glu-L-Lys-D-Ala-D-Ala)]n-diphosphoundecaprenol,
- GlcNAc-(1->4)-Mur2Ac(oyl-L-Ala-gamma-D-Glu-L-Lys-D-Ala-D-Ala)-diphosphoundecaprenol,

whereas its 2 products are

- [GlcNAc-(1->4)-Mur2Ac(oyl-L-Ala-gamma-D-Glu-L-Lys-D-Ala-D-Ala)]n+1-diphosphoundecaprenol, and
- undecaprenyl diphosphate.

== Structural studies ==
As of late 2007, 3 structures have been solved for this class of enzymes, with PDB accession codes PDB: 2BG1, PDB: 2UWX, and PDB: 2UWY.
