= Michael Scott VanNieuwenhze =

American biochemist and Standiford H (born 1962)

Michael Scott VanNieuwenhze (born May 1962) is an American biochemist and Standiford H. Cox Professor at Indiana University Bloomington. He leads a research group working on organic synthesis for problems regarding biological and medical interest.

== Early life and education ==
Michael Scott VanNieuwenhze was born in May 1962, and is a native of San Diego, California. He finished his Bachelor of the Arts from Kalamazoo College in 1984 and a Master of Science degree from Yale University in 1988. He received his Ph.D. degree from Indiana University Bloomington in 1992 under Professor William Roush. He later went to The Scripps Research Institute in La Jolla, California as a postdoctoral, where he worked under Professor K. Barry Sharpless. In 1994, he accepted a position from Discovery Chemistry Research at Eli Lilly and Company, Indianapolis where two patents were filed with his name. In 2002, he moved to the University of San Diego for a faculty position, and in 2007 he came back to Indiana University at Bloomington as an associated professor in chemistry.

== Awards ==
- 2014, inaugural IU Outstanding Faculty Collaborative Research Award
- 2015, NIH award for peptidoglycan building process
- 2018, Standiford H. Cox Professor

== Patents ==
- 2001, Glycopeptide and preparation therof, Eli Lilly and Company
- 2001, Process for preparing lipid II, Eli Lilly and Company

== Publications ==
- VanNieuwenhze MS, Sharpless KB. Kinetic resolution of racemic olefins via asymmetric dihydroxylarion Journal of the American Chemical Society. 115: 7864–7865.
- VanNieuwenhze MS, Sharpless KB. The asymmetric dihydroxylation of cis-allylic and homoallylic alcohols Tetrahedron Letters. 35: 843–846. DOI: 10.1016/S0040-4039(00)75978-8
- VanNieuwenhze MS, Mauldin SC, Zia-Ebrahimi M, Aikins JA, Blaszczak LC. The total synthesis of lipid I. Journal of the American Chemical Society. 123: 6983–8. PMID 11459476 DOI: 10.1021/ja016082o
- VanNieuwenhze MS, Mauldin SC, Zia-Ebrahimi M, Winger BE, Hornback WJ, Saha SL, Aikins JA, Blaszczak LC. The first total synthesis of lipid II: the final monomeric intermediate in bacterial cell wall biosynthesis. Journal of the American Chemical Society. 124: 3656–60. PMID 11929255 DOI: 10.1021/ja017386d
- VanNieuwenhze MS. Chapter 11 Total synthesis of lipid I and lipid II: Late-stage intermediates utilized in bacterial cell wall biosynthesis Strategies and Tactics in Organic Synthesis. 4: 293–313. DOI: 10.1016/S1874-6004(04)80015-7
