= Peptidoglycan =

Polymer in bacterial cell walls

Peptidoglycan, murein or mucopeptide is a unique large macromolecule, a polysaccharide, consisting of sugars and amino acids that forms a mesh-like layer (sacculus) that surrounds the bacterial cytoplasmic membrane. The sugar component consists of alternating residues of β-(1,4) linked N-acetylglucosamine (GlcNAc) and N-acetylmuramic acid (MurNAc). Attached to the N-acetylmuramic acid is an oligopeptide chain made of three to five amino acids. The peptide chain can be cross-linked to the peptide chain of another strand forming the 3D mesh-like layer. Peptidoglycan serves a structural role in the bacterial cell wall, giving structural strength, as well as counteracting the osmotic pressure of the cytoplasm. This repetitive linking results in a dense peptidoglycan layer which is critical for maintaining cell form and withstanding high osmotic pressures, and it is regularly replaced by peptidoglycan production. Peptidoglycan hydrolysis and synthesis are two processes that must occur in order for cells to grow and multiply, a technique carried out in three stages: clipping of current material, insertion of new material, and re-crosslinking of existing material to new material.

The peptidoglycan layer is substantially thicker in gram-positive bacteria (20 to 80 nanometers) than in gram-negative bacteria (7 to 8 nanometers). Depending on pH growth conditions, the peptidoglycan forms around 40 to 90% of the cell wall's dry weight of gram-positive bacteria but only around 10% of gram-negative strains. Thus, presence of high levels of peptidoglycan is the primary determinant of the characterisation of bacteria as gram-positive. In gram-positive strains, it is important in attachment roles and serotyping purposes. For both gram-positive and gram-negative bacteria, particles of approximately 2 nm can pass through the peptidoglycan.

It is difficult to tell whether an organism is gram-positive or gram-negative using a microscope; Gram staining, created by Hans Christian Gram in 1884, is required. The bacteria are stained with the dyes crystal violet and safranin. Gram positive cells are purple after staining, while Gram negative cells stain pink.

== Structure ==
Peptidoglycan.

The peptidoglycan layer within the bacterial cell wall is a crystal lattice structure formed from linear chains of two alternating amino sugars, namely GlcNAc and MurNAc connected by a β-(1,4)-glycosidic bond. Each MurNAc is attached to a short (4- to 5-residue) amino acid chain, containing L-alanine, D-glutamic acid, meso-diaminopimelic acid, and D-alanine in the case of Escherichia coli (a gram-negative bacterium); or L-alanine, D-glutamine, L-lysine, and D-alanine with a 5-glycine interbridge between tetrapeptides in the case of Staphylococcus aureus (a gram-positive bacterium). Peptidoglycan is one of the most important sources of D-amino acids in nature.

By enclosing the inner membrane, the peptidoglycan layer protects the cell from lysis caused by the turgor pressure of the cell. When the cell wall grows, it retains its shape throughout its life, so a rod shape will remain a rod shape, and a spherical shape will remain a spherical shape for life. This happens because the freshly added septal material of synthesis transforms into a hemispherical wall for the offspring cells.

Cross-linking between amino acids in different linear amino sugar chains occurs with the help of the enzyme DD-transpeptidase and results in a 3-dimensional structure that is strong and rigid. The specific amino acid sequence and molecular structure vary with the bacterial species.

The different peptidoglycan types of bacterial cell walls and their taxonomic implications have been described. Archaea (domain Archaea) do not contain peptidoglycan (murein). Some Archaea contain pseudopeptidoglycan (pseudomurein, see below).

The structure of peptidoglycan. NAG = N-acetylglucosamine (also called GlcNAc or NAGA), NAM = N-acetylmuramic acid (also called MurNAc or NAMA).

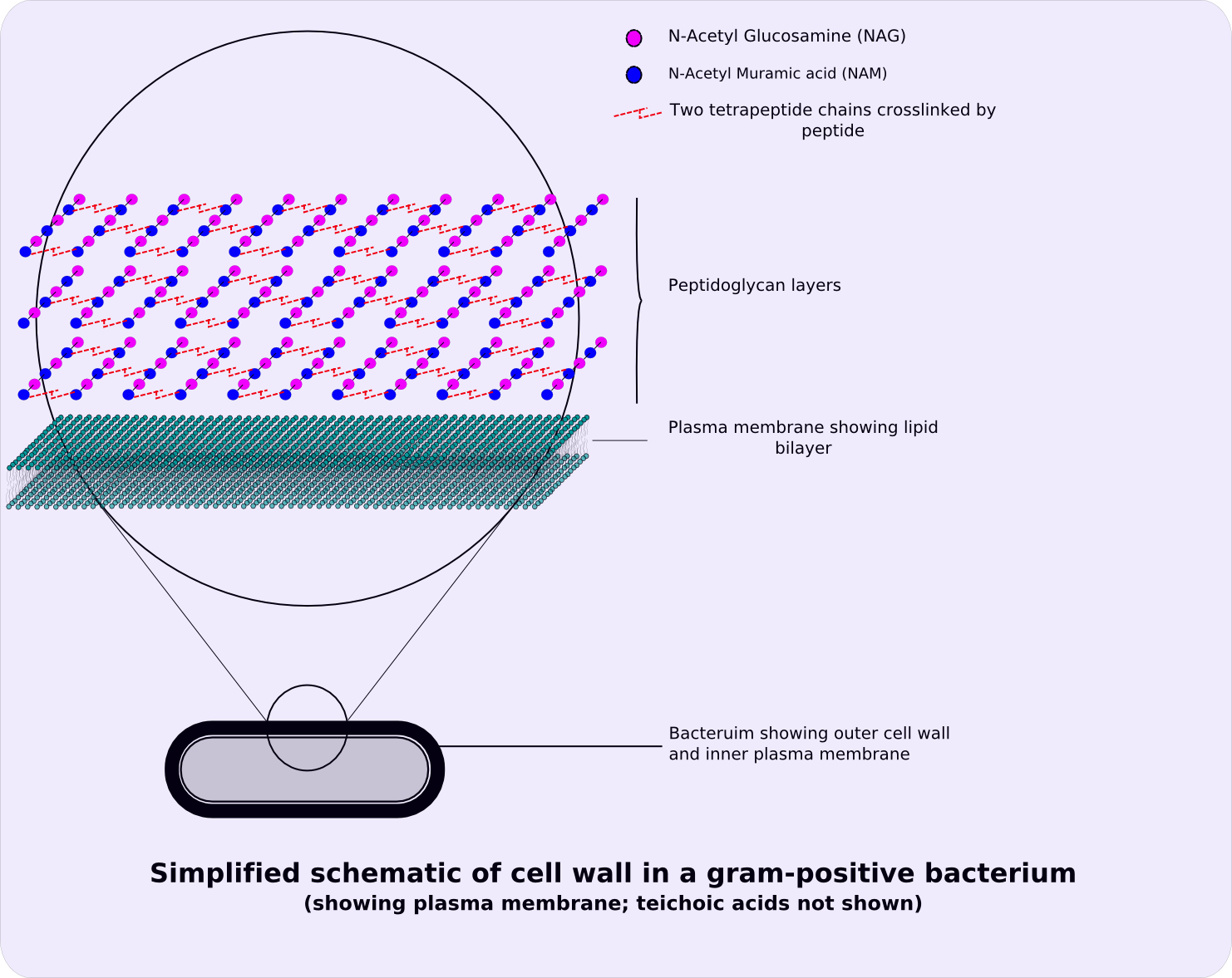
Gram-positive cell wall

Penicillin binding protein forming cross-links in newly formed bacterial cell wall.

Peptidoglycan is involved in binary fission during bacterial cell reproduction. L-form bacteria and mycoplasmas, both lacking peptidoglycan cell walls, do not proliferate by binary fission, but by a budding mechanism.

In the course of early evolution, the successive development of boundaries (membranes, walls) protecting first structures of life against their environment must have been essential for the formation of the first cells (cellularisation).

The invention of rigid peptidoglycan (murein) cell walls in bacteria (domain Bacteria) was probably the prerequisite for their survival, extensive radiation and colonisation of virtually all habitats of the geosphere and hydrosphere.

== Biosynthesis ==
The peptidoglycan monomers are synthesized in the cytosol and are then attached to a membrane carrier bactoprenol. Bactoprenol transports peptidoglycan monomers across the cell membrane where they are inserted into the existing peptidoglycan.

1. In the first step of peptidoglycan synthesis, glutamine, which is an amino acid, donates an amino group to a sugar, fructose 6-phosphate. This reaction, catalyzed by EC 2.6.1.16 (GlmS), turns fructose 6-phosphate into glucosamine-6-phosphate.
2. In step two, an acetyl group is transferred from acetyl CoA to the amino group on the glucosamine-6-phosphate creating N-acetyl-glucosamine-6-phosphate. This reaction is EC 5.4.2.10, catalyzed by GlmM.
3. In step three of the synthesis process, the N-acetyl-glucosamine-6-phosphate is isomerized, which will change N-acetyl-glucosamine-6-phosphate to N-acetyl-glucosamine-1-phosphate. This is EC 2.3.1.157, catalyzed by GlmU.
4. In step 4, the N-acetyl-glucosamine-1-phosphate, which is now a monophosphate, attacks UTP. Uridine triphosphate, which is a pyrimidine nucleotide, has the ability to act as an energy source. In this particular reaction, after the monophosphate has attacked the UTP, an inorganic pyrophosphate is given off and is replaced by the monophosphate, creating UDP-N-acetylglucosamine (2,4). (When UDP is used as an energy source, it gives off an inorganic phosphate.) This initial stage, is used to create the precursor for the NAG in peptidoglycan. This is EC 2.7.7.23, also catalyzed by GlmU, which is a bifunctional enzyme.
5. In step 5, some of the UDP-N-acetylglucosamine (UDP-GlcNAc) is converted to UDP-MurNAc (UDP-N-acetylmuramic acid) by the addition of a lactyl group to the glucosamine. Also in this reaction, the C3 hydroxyl group will remove a phosphate from the alpha carbon of phosphoenolpyruvate. This creates what is called an enol derivative. EC 2.5.1.7, catalyzed by MurA.
6. In step 6, the enol is reduced to a "lactyl moiety" by NADPH in step six. EC 1.3.1.98, catalyzed by MurB.
7. In step 7, the UDP–MurNAc is converted to UDP-MurNAc pentapeptide by the addition of five amino acids, usually including the dipeptide D-alanyl-D-alanine. This is a string of three reactions: EC 6.3.2.8 by MurC, EC 6.3.2.9 by MurD, and EC 6.3.2.13 by MurE.

Each of these reactions requires the energy source ATP. This is all referred to as Stage one.

Stage two occurs in the cytoplasmic membrane. It is in the membrane where a lipid carrier called bactoprenol carries peptidoglycan precursors through the cell membrane.

1. Undecaprenyl phosphate will attack the UDP-MurNAc penta, creating a PP-MurNac penta, which is now a lipid (lipid I). EC 2.7.8.13 by MraY.
2. UDP-GlcNAc is then transported to MurNAc, creating Lipid-PP-MurNAc penta-GlcNAc (lipid II), a disaccharide, also a precursor to peptidoglycan. EC 2.4.1.227 by MurG.
3. Lipid II is transported across the membrane by flippase (MurJ), a discovery made in 2014 after decades of searching. Once it is there, it is added to the growing glycan chain by the enzyme peptidoglycan glycosyltransferase (GTase, EC 2.4.1.129). This reaction is known as transglycosylation. In the reaction, the hydroxyl group of the GlcNAc will attach to the MurNAc in the glycan, which will displace the lipid-PP from the glycan chain.
4. In a final step, the DD-transpeptidase (TPase, EC 3.4.16.4) crosslinks individual glycan chains. This protein is also known as the penicillin-binding protein. Some versions of the enzyme also performs the glycosyltransferase function, while others leave the job to a separate enzyme.

== Pseudopeptidoglycan ==
In some archaea, i.e. members of the Methanobacteriales and in the genus Methanopyrus, pseudopeptidoglycan (pseudomurein) has been found. In pseudopeptidoglycan the sugar residues are β-(1,3) linked N-acetylglucosamine and N-acetyltalosaminuronic acid. This makes the cell walls of such archaea insensitive to lysozyme. The biosynthesis of pseudopeptidoglycan has been described.

== Recognition by immune system ==
Peptidoglycan recognition is an evolutionarily conserved process. The overall structure is similar between bacterial species, but various modifications can increase the diversity. These include modifications of the length of sugar polymers, modifications in the sugar structures, variations in cross-linking or substitutions of amino acids (primarily at the third position). The aim of these modifications is to alter the properties of the cell wall, which plays a vital role in pathogenesis.

Peptidoglycans can be degraded by several enzymes (lysozyme, glucosaminidase, endopeptidase...), producing immunostimulatory fragments (sometimes called muropeptides) that are critical for mediating host-pathogen interactions. These include muramyl dipeptide (MDP), N-acetylglucosamine (NAG), or γ-d-glutamyl-meso-diaminopimelic acid (iE-DAP).

Peptidoglycan from intestinal bacteria (both pathogens and commensals) crosses the intestinal barrier even under physiological conditions. Mechanisms through which peptidoglycan or its fragments enter the host cells can be direct (carrier-independent) or indirect (carrier-dependent), and they are either bacteria-mediated (secretion systems, membrane vesicles) or host cell-mediated (receptor-mediated, peptide transporters). Bacterial secretion systems are protein complexes used for the delivery of virulence factors across the bacterial cell envelope to the exterior environment. Intracellular bacterial pathogens invade eukaryotic cells (which may lead to the formation of phagolysosomes and/or autophagy activation), or bacteria may be engulfed by phagocytes (macrophages, monocytes, neutrophils...). The bacteria-containing phagosome may then fuse with endosomes and lysosomes, leading to degradation of bacteria and generation of polymeric peptidoglycan fragments and muropeptides.

=== Receptors ===
Innate immune system senses intact peptidoglycan and peptidoglycan fragments using numerous PRRs (pattern recognition receptors) that are secreted, expressed intracellularly or expressed on the cell surface.

==== Peptidoglycan recognition proteins ====
PGLYRPs are conserved from insects to mammals. Mammals produce four secreted soluble peptidoglycan recognition proteins (PGLYRP-1, PGLYRP-2, PGLYRP-3 and PGLYRP-4) that recognize muramyl pentapeptide or tetrapeptide. They can also bind to LPS and other molecules by using binding sites outside of the peptidoglycan-binding groove. After recognition of peptidoglycan, PGLYRPs activate polyphenol oxidase (PPO) molecules, Toll, or immune deficiency (IMD) signalling pathways. That leads to production of antimicrobial peptides (AMPs).

Each of the mammalian PGLYRPs display unique tissue expression patterns. PGLYRP-1 is mainly expressed in the granules of neutrophils and eosinophils. PGLYRP-3 and 4 are expressed by several tissues such as skin, sweat glands, eyes or the intestinal tract. PGLYRP-1, 3 and 4 form disulphide-linked homodimers and heterodimers essential for their bactericidal activity. Their binding to bacterial cell wall peptidoglycans can induce bacterial cell death by interaction with various bacterial transcriptional regulatory proteins. PGLYRPs are likely to assist in bacterial killing by cooperating with other PRRs to enhance recognition of bacteria by phagocytes.

PGLYRP-2 is primarily expressed by the liver and secreted into the circulation. Also, its expression can be induced in skin keratinocytes, oral and intestinal epithelial cells. In contrast with the other PGLYRPs, PGLYRP-2 has no direct bactericidal activity. It possesses peptidoglycan amidase activity, it hydrolyses the lactyl-amide bond between the MurNAc and the first amino acid of the stem peptide of peptidoglycan. It is proposed, that the function of PGLYRP-2 is to prevent over-activation of the immune system and inflammation-induced tissue damage in response to NOD2 ligands (see below), as these muropeptides can no longer be recognized by NOD2 upon separation of the peptide component from MurNAc. Growing evidence suggests that peptidoglycan recognition protein family members play a dominant role in the tolerance of intestinal epithelial cells toward the commensal microbiota. It has been demonstrated that expression of PGLYRP-2 and 4 can influence the composition of the intestinal microbiota.

Recently, it has been discovered, that PGLYRPs (and also NOD-like receptors and peptidoglycan transporters) are highly expressed in the developing mouse brain. PGLYRP-2 and is highly expressed in neurons of several brain regions including the prefrontal cortex, hippocampus, and cerebellum, thus indicating potential direct effects of peptidoglycan on neurons. PGLYRP-2 is highly expressed also in the cerebral cortex of young children, but not in most adult cortical tissues. PGLYRP-1 is also expressed in the brain and continues to be expressed into adulthood.

==== NOD-like receptors ====
Probably the most well-known receptors of peptidoglycan are the NOD-like receptors (NLRs), mainly NOD1 and NOD2. The NOD1 receptor is activated after iE-DAP (γ-d-glutamyl-meso-diaminopimelic acid) binding, while NOD2 recognizes MDP (muramyl dipeptide), by their LRR domains. Activation leads to self-oligomerization, resulting in activation of two signalling cascades. One triggers activation of NF-κB (through RIP2, TAK1 and IKK), second leads to MAPK signalling cascade. Activation of these pathways induces production of inflammatory cytokines and chemokines.

NOD1 is expressed by diverse cell types, including myeloid phagocytes, epithelial cells and neurons. NOD2 is expressed in monocytes and macrophages, epithelial intestinal cells, Paneth cells, dendritic cells, osteoblasts, keratinocytes and other epithelial cell types. As cytosolic sensors, NOD1 and NOD2 must either detect bacteria that enter the cytosol, or peptidoglycan must be degraded to generate fragments that must be transported into the cytosol for these sensors to function.

Recently, it was demonstrated that NLRP3 is activated by peptidoglycan, through a mechanism that is independent of NOD1 and NOD2. In macrophages, N-acetylglucosamine generated by peptidoglycan degradation was found to inhibit hexokinase activity and induce its release from the mitochondrial membrane. It promotes NLRP3 inflammasome activation through a mechanism triggered by increased mitochondrial membrane permeability.

NLRP1 is also considered as a cytoplasmic sensor of peptidoglycan. It can sense MDP and promote IL-1 secretion through binding NOD2.

==== C-type lectin receptors (CLRs) ====
C-type lectins are a diverse superfamily of mainly Ca^{2+}-dependent proteins that bind a variety of carbohydrates (including the glycan skeleton of peptidoglycan), and function as innate immune receptors. CLR proteins that bind to peptidoglycan include mannose binding lectin (MBL), ficolins, Reg3A (regeneration gene family protein 3A), and PTCLec1. In mammals, they initiate the lectin-pathway of the complement cascade.

==== Toll-like receptors ====
The role of toll-like receptors (TLRs) in direct recognition of peptidoglycan is controversial. In some studies, has been reported that peptidoglycan is sensed by TLR2. But this TLR2-inducing activity could be due to cell wall lipoproteins and lipoteichoic acids that commonly co-purify with peptidoglycan. Also variation in peptidoglycan structure in bacteria from species to species may contribute to the differing results on this topic.

== As vaccine or adjuvant ==
Peptidoglycan is immunologically active, which can stimulate immune cells to increase the expression of cytokines and enhance antibody-dependent specific response when combined with vaccine or as adjuvant alone. MDP, which is the basic unit of peptidoglycan, was initially used as the active component of Freund's adjuvant. Peptidoglycan from Staphylococcus aureus was used as a vaccine to protect mice, showing that after vaccine injection for 40 weeks, the mice survived from S. aureus challenge at an increased lethal dose.

== Inhibition and degradation ==
Some antibacterial drugs such as penicillin interfere with the production of peptidoglycan by binding to bacterial enzymes known as penicillin-binding proteins or DD-transpeptidases. Penicillin-binding proteins form the bonds between oligopeptide crosslinks in peptidoglycan. For a bacterial cell to reproduce through binary fission, more than a million peptidoglycan subunits (NAM-NAG+oligopeptide) must be attached to existing subunits. Mutations in genes coding for transpeptidases that lead to reduced interactions with an antibiotic are a significant source of emerging antibiotic resistance. Since peptidoglycan is also lacking in L-form bacteria and in mycoplasmas, both are resistant against penicillin.

Other steps of peptidoglycan synthesis can also be targeted. The topical antibiotic bacitracin targets the utilization of C55-isoprenyl pyrophosphate. Lantibiotics, which include the food preservative nisin, attack lipid II.

Lysozyme, which is found in tears and constitutes part of the body's innate immune system exerts its antibacterial effect by breaking the β-(1,4)-glycosidic bonds in peptidoglycan (see above). Lysozyme is more effective in acting against gram-positive bacteria, in which the peptidoglycan cell wall is exposed, than against gram-negative bacteria, which have an outer layer of LPS covering the peptidoglycan layer. Several bacterial peptidoglycan modifications can result in resistance to degradation by lysozyme. Susceptibility of bacteria to degradation is also considerably affected by exposure to antibiotics. Exposed bacteria synthesize peptidoglycan that contains shorter sugar chains that are poorly crosslinked and this peptidoglycan is then more easily degraded by lysozyme.

== Peptidoglycan as a danger signal among bacteria ==
A 2025 study reported that peptidoglycan fragments released from lysed bacterial cells can function as a general danger signal among diverse bacterial species. Exposure to exogenous peptidoglycan was shown to rapidly induce the formation of three‑dimensional biofilms in Vibrio cholerae, Pseudomonas aeruginosa, Staphylococcus aureus, Acinetobacter baumannii and Enterococcus faecalis. Even brief exposure was sufficient to trigger a regulated response leading to increased production of biofilm matrix components. In V. cholerae, peptidoglycan exposure upregulated several genes involved in matrix synthesis, including the vps‑I and vps‑II gene clusters that contribute to biofilm structure. The mechanism by which bacteria sense extracellular peptidoglycan fragments remains unknown.

== See also ==
- Undecaprenyl-diphosphatase
