= LACTB =

Protein-coding gene in the species Homo sapiens

Identifiers
- Aliases: LACTB, G24, MRPL56, lactamase beta
- External IDs: OMIM: 608440; MGI: 1933395; GeneCards: LACTB

Gene location (Human)
| Chr. | Chromosome 15 (human) |
| Band | 15q22.2 | Start | 63,121,833 bp |
| Band | 15q22.2 | End | 63,142,061 bp |

Gene location (Mouse)
| Chr. | Chromosome 9 (mouse) |
| Band | 9|9 C | Start | 66,862,670 bp |
| Band | 9|9 C | End | 66,882,766 bp |
RNA expression pattern
| Bgee | Human / Mouse (ortholog); Top expressed in: myocardium of left ventricle; monocyte; deltoid muscle; pancreatic epithelial cell; vastus lateralis muscle; tibialis anterior muscle; sperm; amniotic fluid; gastrocnemius muscle; Skeletal muscle tissue of rectus abdominis / Top expressed in: left lobe of liver; proximal tubule; interventricular septum; right kidney; primitive streak; human kidney; otic vesicle; seminal vesicula; ciliary body; retinal pigment epithelium; More reference expression data |
| BioGPS | n/a |
Gene ontology
| Molecular function | hydrolase activity; peptidase activity; identical protein binding |
| Cellular component | mitochondrion; cytosol |
| Biological process | regulation of lipid metabolic process; proteolysis; lipid metabolism |
Sources:Amigo / QuickGO
Orthologs
| Databases | NCBI: entry; OMA: entry |
| Species | Human | Mouse |
| Entrez | 114294 | 80907 |
| Ensembl | ENSG00000103642 | ENSMUSG00000032370 |
| UniProt | P83111 | Q9EP89 |
| RefSeq (mRNA) | NM_001288585; NM_032857; NM_171846 | NM_030717 |
| RefSeq (protein) | NP_001275514; NP_116246; NP_741982 | NP_109642 |
| Location (UCSC) | Chr 15: 63.12 – 63.14 Mb | Chr 9: 66.86 – 66.88 Mb |
| PubMed search |
- Wikidata
| View/Edit Human | View/Edit Mouse |

Serine beta-lactamase-like protein LACTB, mitochondrial is an enzyme that in humans is encoded by the LACTB gene. This gene encodes a 54 kDa protein sharing significant sequence similarity to serine proteases of the penicillin binding protein and beta-lactamase superfamily occurring in bacteria. It is involved in the regulation of the metabolic circuitry. A causal association has been found between LACTB and obesity. In breast cancer, LACTB has a tumor suppressor function by modulating lipid metabolism.

== Structure ==
=== Gene ===
The LACTB gene is located at chromosome 15q22.1, consisting of 8 exons. Alternative splicing results in multiple transcript variants encoding different protein isoforms.

=== Protein ===
LACTB shares sequence similarity to the beta-lactamase/penicillin-binding protein family of serine proteases that are involved in bacterial cell wall metabolism. The N-terminal 97 amino acid segment of LACTB does not form part of the conserved penicillin-binding protein domain and may therefore be responsible for organelle targeting.

== Function ==
LACTB is widely expressed in different mammalian tissues, with the predominant expression in human skeletal muscle. It localizes in the mitochondrial intermembrane space. LACTB can polymerize into stable filaments occupying the mitochondrial intermembrane space. These filaments are speculated to play a role in submitochondrial organization and therefore possibly affect mitochondrial metabolon organization.

== Clinical significance ==
It has been found LACTB could cause obesity through gene co-expression analysis based on data integrated from multiple sources. This has been validated in vivo through LACTB overexpression in transgenic mice, which resulted in an obese phenotype. LACTB has also been identified to be a tumor suppressor through its effect on mitochondrial phospholipid metabolism and modulation of cell differentiation state.

== Interactions ==
- MiR-125b-5p
