= Phospho-N-acetylmuramoyl-pentapeptide-transferase =

phospho-N-acetylmuramoyl-pentapeptide-transferase

Identifiers
- EC no.: 2.7.8.13
- CAS no.: 9068-50-2

Databases
- IntEnz: IntEnz view
- BRENDA: BRENDA entry
- ExPASy: NiceZyme view
- KEGG: KEGG entry
- MetaCyc: metabolic pathway
- PRIAM: profile
- PDB structures: RCSB PDB PDBe PDBsum
- Gene Ontology: AmiGO / QuickGO
Search
- PMC: articles
- PubMed: articles
- NCBI: proteins

In enzymology, a phospho-N-acetylmuramoyl-pentapeptide-transferase (EC 2.7.8.13) is an enzyme that catalyzes the chemical reaction

UDP-Mur_{2}Ac(oyl-L-Ala-gamma-D-Glu-L-Lys-D-Ala-D-Ala) + undecaprenyl phosphate $\rightleftharpoons$ UMP + Mur_{2}Ac(oyl-L-Ala-gamma-D-Glu-L-Lys-D-Ala-D-Ala)-diphosphoundecaprenol

Thus, the two substrates of this enzyme are UDP-Mur2Ac(oyl-L-Ala-gamma-D-Glu-L-Lys-D-Ala-D-Ala) and undecaprenyl phosphate, whereas its 2 products are UMP and Mur2Ac(oyl-L-Ala-gamma-D-Glu-L-Lys-D-Ala-D-Ala)-diphosphoundecaprenol.

This enzyme participates in peptidoglycan biosynthesis. It can be expressed efficiently by a cell-free protein expression system.

== Nomenclature ==
This enzyme belongs to the family of transferases, specifically those transferring non-standard substituted phosphate groups. The systematic name of this enzyme class is UDP-MurAc(oyl-L-Ala-gamma-D-Glu-L-Lys-D-Ala-D-Ala): undecaprenyl-phosphate phospho-N-acetylmuramoyl-pentapeptide-transferase. Other names in common use include translocase I, MraY transferase, UDP-MurNAc-L-Ala-D-gamma-Glu-L-Lys-D-Ala-D-Ala:C55-isoprenoid, alcohol transferase, UDP-MurNAc-Ala-gammaDGlu-Lys-DAla-DAla:undecaprenylphosphate, transferase, phospho-N-acetylmuramoyl pentapeptide translocase, phospho-MurNAc-pentapeptide transferase, phospho-NAc-muramoyl-pentapeptide translocase (UMP), phosphoacetylmuramoylpentapeptide translocase, and phosphoacetylmuramoylpentapeptidetransferase.
