= Copsin =

Copsin is a fungal defensin that acts as an antimicrobial polypeptide secreted from the inky cap mushroom, first reported at the end of 2014. The fungal defensin acts against gram positive bacteria.

== History ==
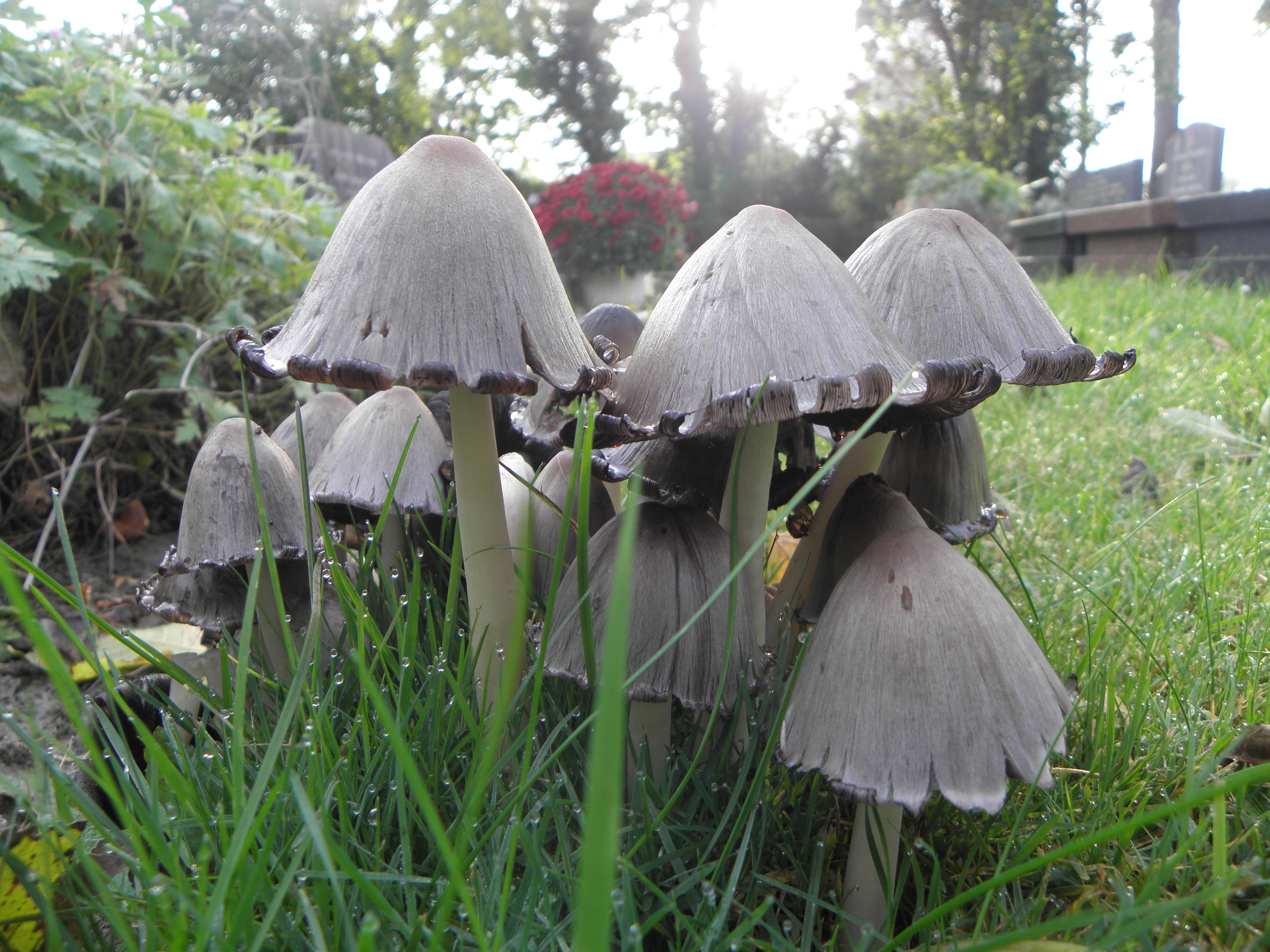
A group of young common ink cap mushrooms

In October 2014, a collaboration of the Swiss Federal Institute of Technology, Switzerland and the University of Bonn, Germany reported, that they had identified a new antimicrobial peptide, excreted from the inky cap mushroom (Coprinopsis cinerea) grown on horse dung.

== Biosynthesis ==
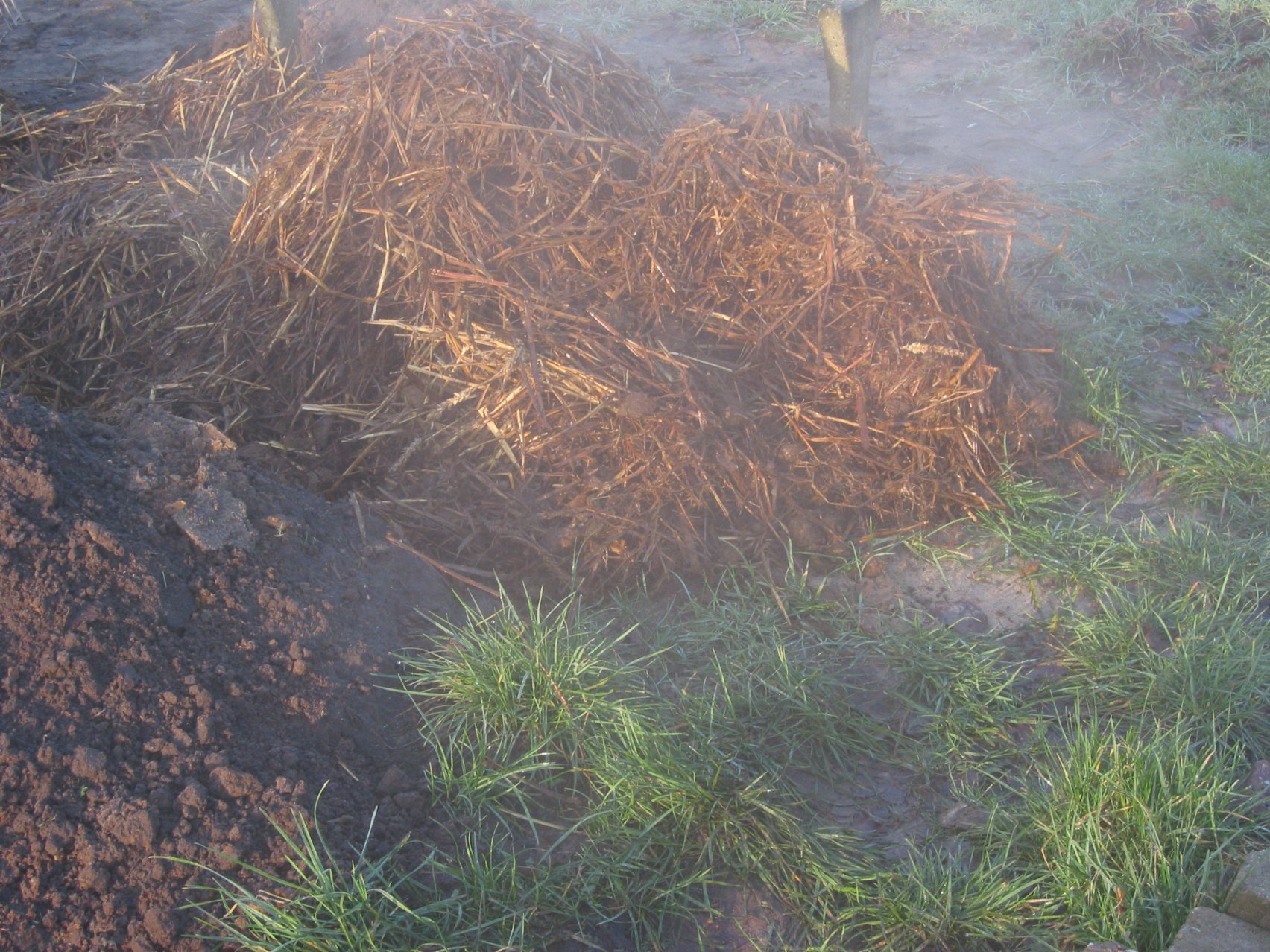
Horse manure

The polypeptide was recombinantly produced in a yeast named Pichia pastoris which grew over five days. the peptide has an extremely compact three-dimensional structure on NMR spectroscopy.

== Mechanism of action ==
Copsin is an inhibitor of cell wall synthesis by binding to Lipid II. It was reported to be potent in the petri dish against Gram positive bacteria which have a cell wall, including Enterococcus faecium and Listeria monocytogenes. It is not active against bacteria with an outer membrane, such as gram negative bacteria.

== Potential use ==
The "exceptionally stable protein", can be boiled at 100 degrees Celsius, can be mixed in strong acid for hours, and can also survive very aggressive enzymes, " remaining completely active". It is considered for use in the food industry for food preservation.

== See also ==
- defensins
- plectasin, the first fungal defensin discovered 2005
