= Undecaprenol kinase =

Class of enzymes

undecaprenol kinase

Identifiers
- EC no.: 2.7.1.66
- CAS no.: 9068-22-8

Databases
- IntEnz: IntEnz view
- BRENDA: BRENDA entry
- ExPASy: NiceZyme view
- KEGG: KEGG entry
- MetaCyc: metabolic pathway
- PRIAM: profile
- PDB structures: RCSB PDB PDBe PDBsum
- Gene Ontology: AmiGO / QuickGO
Search
- PMC: articles
- PubMed: articles
- NCBI: proteins

In enzymology, an undecaprenol kinase (EC 2.7.1.66) is an enzyme that catalyzes the chemical reaction

ATP + undecaprenol $\rightleftharpoons$ ADP + undecaprenyl phosphate

Thus, the two substrates of this enzyme are ATP and undecaprenol, whereas its two products are ADP and undecaprenyl phosphate.

This enzyme belongs to the family of transferases, specifically those transferring phosphorus-containing groups (phosphotransferases) with an alcohol group as acceptor. The systematic name of this enzyme class is ATP:undecaprenol phosphotransferase. Other names in common use include isoprenoid alcohol kinase, isoprenoid alcohol phosphokinase, C55-isoprenoid alcohol phosphokinase, isoprenoid alcohol kinase (phosphorylating), C55-isoprenoid alcohol kinase, C55-isoprenyl alcohol phosphokinase, and polyisoprenol kinase. This enzyme participates in peptidoglycan biosynthesis.
