= PASTA domain =

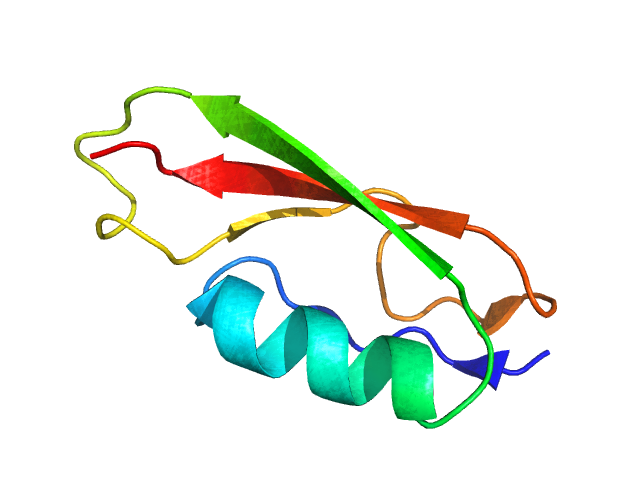
- Cartoon representation of PASTA domain from Staphylococcus aureus. PDB entry 3m9g

Identifiers
- Symbol: PASTA
- Pfam: PF03793
- InterPro: IPR005543
- SMART: PASTA
- PROSITE: PDOC51178
- SCOP2: 1rp5 / SCOPe / SUPFAM
- CDD: cd06573
Available protein structures:
- Pfam: structures / ECOD
- PDB: RCSB PDB; PDBe; PDBj
- PDBsum: structure summary
- PDB: 1k25A:694-750, 1qmeA:694-750, 1rp5B:694-750, 1qmfA:694-750, 1pyyA:694-750

The PASTA domain is a small protein domain that can bind to the beta-lactam ring portion of various β-lactam antibiotics. The domain was initially discovered in 2002 by Yeats and colleagues as a region of sequence similarity found in penicillin binding proteins and PknB-like kinases found in some bacteria. The name is an acronym derived from PBP and Serine/Threonine kinase Associated domain.

== Structure ==
The PASTA domain adopts a structure composed of an alpha-helix followed by three beta strands. Recent structural studies show that the extracellular region of PknB (protein kinase B) that is composed of four PASTA domains shows a linear arrangement of the domains.

== Species distribution ==
PASTA domains are found in a variety of bacterial species including gram-positive Bacillota and Actinomycetota.
