= Glucosamine-1-phosphate N-acetyltransferase =

Identifiers
- EC no.: 2.3.1.157

Databases
- IntEnz: IntEnz view
- BRENDA: BRENDA entry
- ExPASy: NiceZyme view
- KEGG: KEGG entry
- MetaCyc: metabolic pathway
- PRIAM: profile
- PDB structures: RCSB PDB PDBe PDBsum
- Gene Ontology: AmiGO / QuickGO
Search
- PMC: articles
- PubMed: articles
- NCBI: proteins

Glucosamine-1-phosphate N-acetyltransferase (EC 2.3.1.157) is an enzyme that catalyzes the chemical reaction

(1)
+
acetyl-CoA
(2)
+ coenzyme A

The two substrates of this enzyme characterised from Escherichia coli are α-D-glucosamine 1-phosphate (1) and acetyl-CoA. Its two products are N-acetyl-α-D-glucosamine 1-phosphate (2) and coenzyme A. The enzyme is part of the biosynthetic pathway to UDP-N-acetylglucosamine.

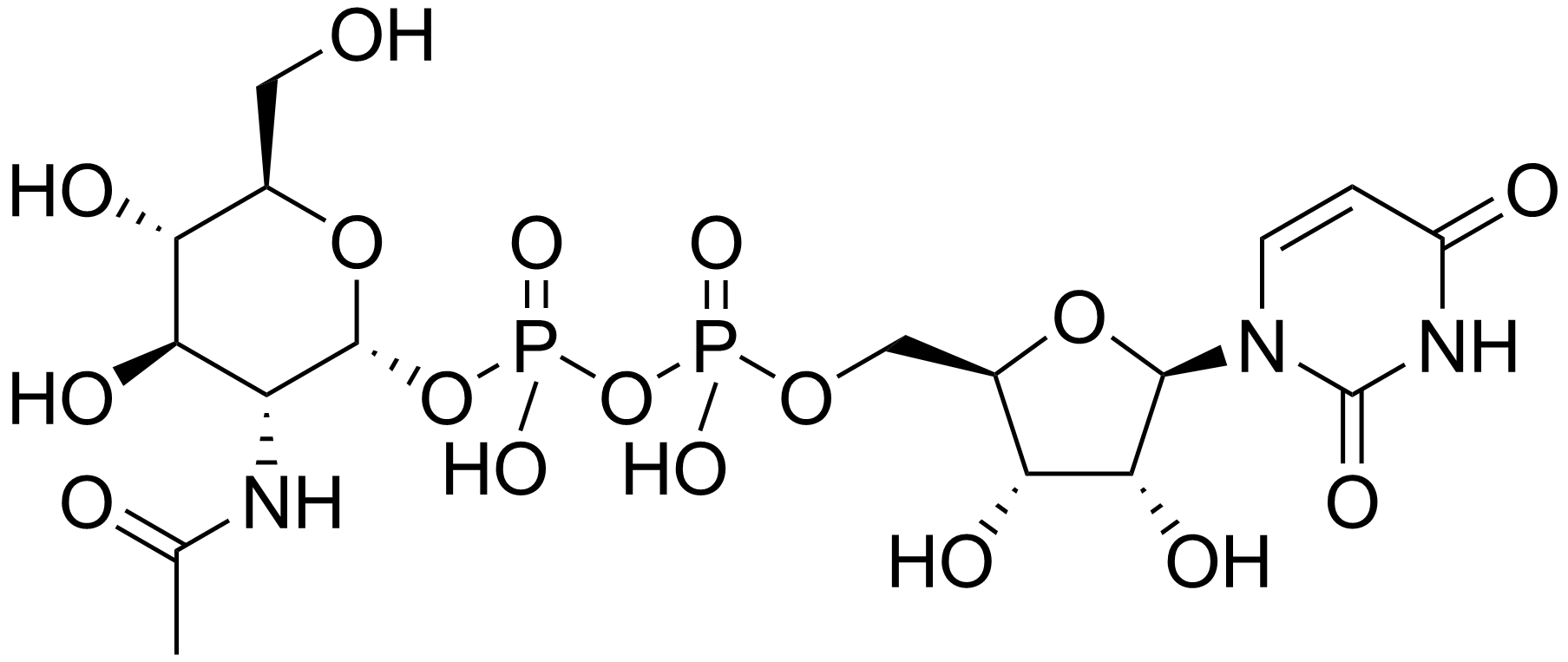
UDP-N-acetylglucosamine

This enzyme belongs to the family of transferases, specifically those acyltransferases transferring groups other than aminoacyl groups. The systematic name of this enzyme class is acetyl-CoA:alpha-D-glucosamine-1-phosphate N-acetyltransferase.

== Structural studies ==
As of late 2007, 3 structures have been solved for this class of enzymes, with PDB accession codes 2OI5, 2OI6, and 2OI7.
