= Penicillin-binding proteins =

Class of proteins

Penicillin-binding protein, transpeptidase

Identifiers
- Symbol: PCN-bd_Tpept
- Pfam: PF00905
- InterPro: IPR001460
- OPM superfamily: 195
- OPM protein: 5hlb
- Membranome: 541
Available protein structures:
- PDB: IPR001460 PF00905 (ECOD; PDBsum)
- AlphaFold: IPR001460; PF00905

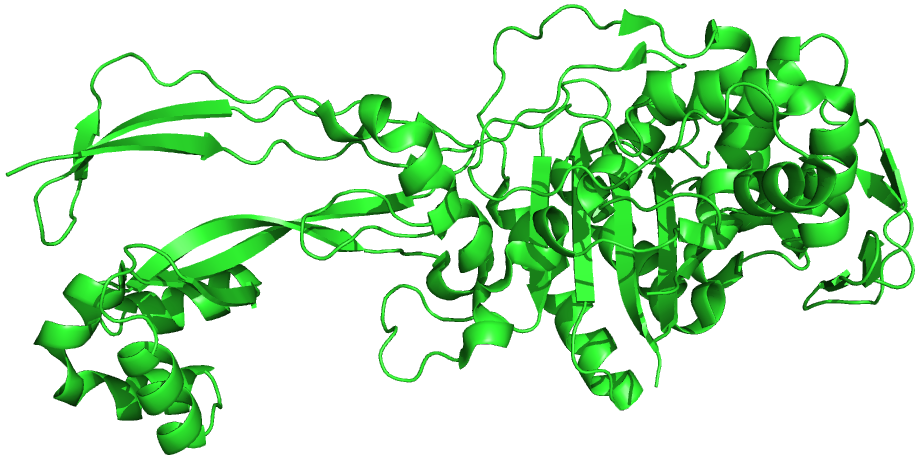
Ribbon representation of the atomic structure of Penicillin Binding Protein 3 from Pseudomonas aeruginosa (PDB 3OC2), image created with PyMol.

Penicillin-binding protein, dimerisation domain

Identifiers
- Symbol: PBP_dimer
- Pfam: PF03717
- InterPro: IPR005311
Available protein structures:
- PDB: PDB: 1k25 PDB: 1mwr PDB: 1mws PDB: 1mwt PDB: 1mwu PDB: 1pmd PDB: 1pyy PDB: 1qme PDB: 1qmf PDB: 1rp5 IPR005311 PF03717 (ECOD; PDBsum)
- AlphaFold: IPR005311; PF03717

PBPs normally catalyze the cross-linking of the bacterial cell wall, but they can be permanently inhibited by penicillin and other β-lactam antibiotics. (NAM = N-acetylmuramic acid; NAG = N-acetylglucosamine)

Penicillin-binding proteins (PBP) are a group of proteins that are characterized by their affinity for and binding of penicillin. They are a normal constituent of many bacteria; the name just reflects the way by which the protein was discovered. All β-lactam antibiotics (except for tabtoxinine-β-lactam, which inhibits glutamine synthetase) bind to PBPs, which are essential for bacterial cell wall synthesis. PBPs are members of a subgroup of transpeptidase enzymes called DD-transpeptidases.

== Diversity ==
There are a large number of PBPs, usually several in each organism, and they are found as both membrane-bound and cytoplasmic proteins. For example, Spratt (1977) reports that six different PBPs are routinely detected in all strains of E. coli ranging in molecular weight from 40,000 to 91,000. The different PBPs occur in different numbers per cell and have varied affinities for penicillin. The PBPs are usually broadly classified into high-molecular-weight (HMW) and low-molecular-weight (LMW) categories. High Molecular Mass (HMM) PBP’s are essential for cell viability and they are divided between two classes. Class A enzymes catalyze both the polymerization of a peptidoglycan from disaccharide peptides (glycosyltransferase) and the cross-linking of muramyl peptides (transpeptidase). On the other hand, class B enzymes possess transpeptidase activity (only cross linking). Low Molecular-Mass (LMM) PBP’s are dispensable for normal cell growth and control how tightly the peptidoglycan chains are linked together. Proteins that have evolved from PBPs occur in many higher organisms and include the mammalian LACTB protein.

== Function ==
PBPs are all involved in the final stages of the synthesis of peptidoglycan, which is the major component of bacterial cell walls. Bacterial cell wall synthesis is essential to growth, cell division (thus reproduction) and maintaining the cellular structure in bacteria. Inhibition of PBPs leads to defects in cell wall structure and irregularities in cell shape, for example filamentation, pseudomulticellular forms, lesions leading to spheroplast formation, and eventual cell death and lysis.

PBPs have been shown to catalyze a number of reactions involved in the process of synthesizing cross-linked peptidoglycan from lipid intermediates and mediating the removal of D-alanine from the precursor of peptidoglycan. Purified enzymes have been shown to catalyze the following reactions: D-alanine carboxypeptidase, peptidoglycan transpeptidase, and peptidoglycan endopeptidase. In all bacteria that have been studied, enzymes have been shown to catalyze more than one of the above reactions. The enzyme has a penicillin-insensitive transglycosylase N-terminal domain (involved in formation of linear glycan strands) and a penicillin-sensitive transpeptidase C-terminal domain (involved in cross-linking of the peptide subunits) and the serine at the active site is conserved in all members of the PBP family.

Some low-molecular-weight PBPs associate with the MreB cytoskeleton and follow its rotation around the cell, inserting petipdoglycan in an oriented manner during cell growth. In contrast, high-molecular-weight PBPs are independent from MreB and maintain cell wall integrity by detecting and repairing defects in the peptidoglycan.

== Antibiotics ==
PBPs bind to β-lactam antibiotics because they are similar in chemical structure to the modular pieces that form the peptidoglycan. When they bind to penicillin, the β-lactam amide bond is ruptured to form a covalent bond with the catalytic serine residue at the PBPs' active site. This is an irreversible reaction and inactivates the enzyme.

There has been a great deal of research into PBPs because of their role in antibiotics and resistance. Bacterial cell wall synthesis and the role of PBPs in its synthesis is a very good target for drugs of selective toxicity because the metabolic pathways and enzymes are unique to bacteria. Resistance to antibiotics has come about through overproduction of PBPs and formation of PBPs that have low affinity for penicillins (among other mechanisms such as lactamase production). These experiments change the structure of PBP by adding different amino acids into the protein, allowing for new discovery of how the drug interacts with the protein. Research on PBPs has led to the discovery of new semi-synthetic β-lactams, wherein altering the side-chains on the original penicillin molecule has increased the affinity of PBPs for penicillin, and, thus, increased effectiveness in bacteria with developing resistance.

Presence of the protein penicillin binding protein 2A (PBP2A) is responsible for the antibiotic resistance seen in methicillin-resistant Staphylococcus aureus (MRSA).

The β-lactam ring is a structure common to all β-lactam antibiotics.

== Structure of penicillin binding protein 3 ==
Penicillin binding protein 3 is important for bacteria wall synthesis and is a main target in β-lactam antibiotics. It is a two-domain protein containing a C-terminal transpeptidase linked to an extended N-terminal domain. This protein is similar to other class B PBP’s since it contains an α-helical subdomain or “head” domain towards the N-terminus. The N-terminal domain’s function is still not known but it is thought it serves to position the transpeptidase domain away from the inner membrane as part of a multienzyme complex involved in cell wall biosynthesis.

=== Active site of penicillin binding protein 3 and a β-lactam (carbenicillin) ===
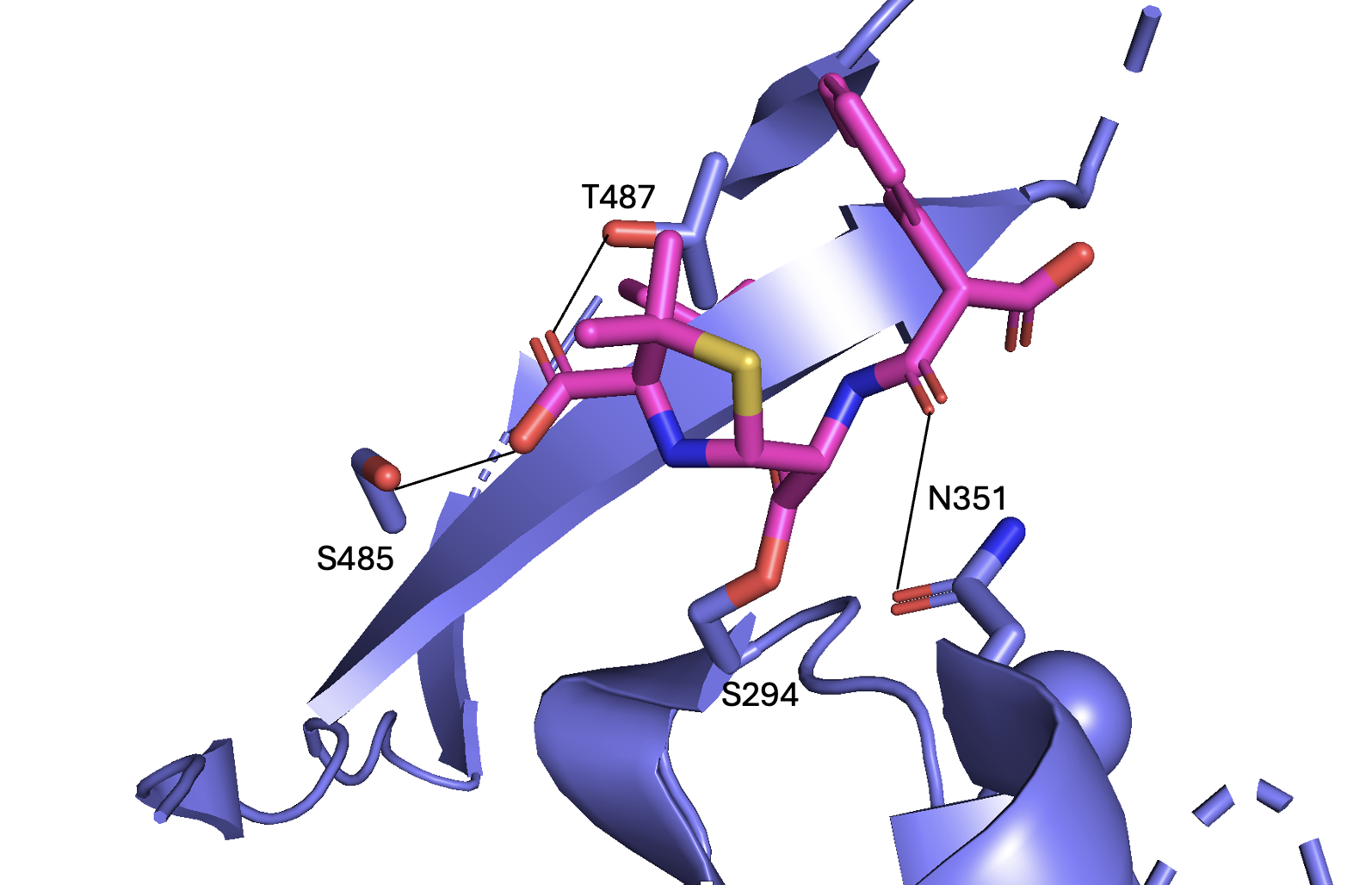
This image shows the active site of Penicillin Binding Protein 3 with carbenicillin in the active site (colored in pink with red, blue, and yellow representing different atoms). The serine residue positioned at 294, is covalently bound to the carbenicillin. This creates hydrogen bonding interactions between carboxylate groups on the carbenicillin and amino acid residues, N351, S485, and T487. (PBD - 3OCL)

The active site is located in a long cleft running parallel with the 3 strand across the lower part of the transpeptidase domain. When carbenicillin binds to penicillin binding protein 3, it forms an acyl-enzyme complex which means the β-lactam is chemically attached to PBP3. The β-lactams are covalently bound to S294 which inactivates the enzyme. Also, the N-terminal end of PBP3 is more flexible, however, the C-terminal part, which contains the enzyme’s active site, is very stable and does not change much. The binding of carbenicillin to the active site increases the enzyme's thermostability with conformational changes. The first carboxylate group in carbenicillin forms hydrogen bonding interactions with S485, T487, and N351. These hydrogen bonding interactions help stabilize the binding between carbenicillin and PBP 3.

== Other images ==
Penicillin core.

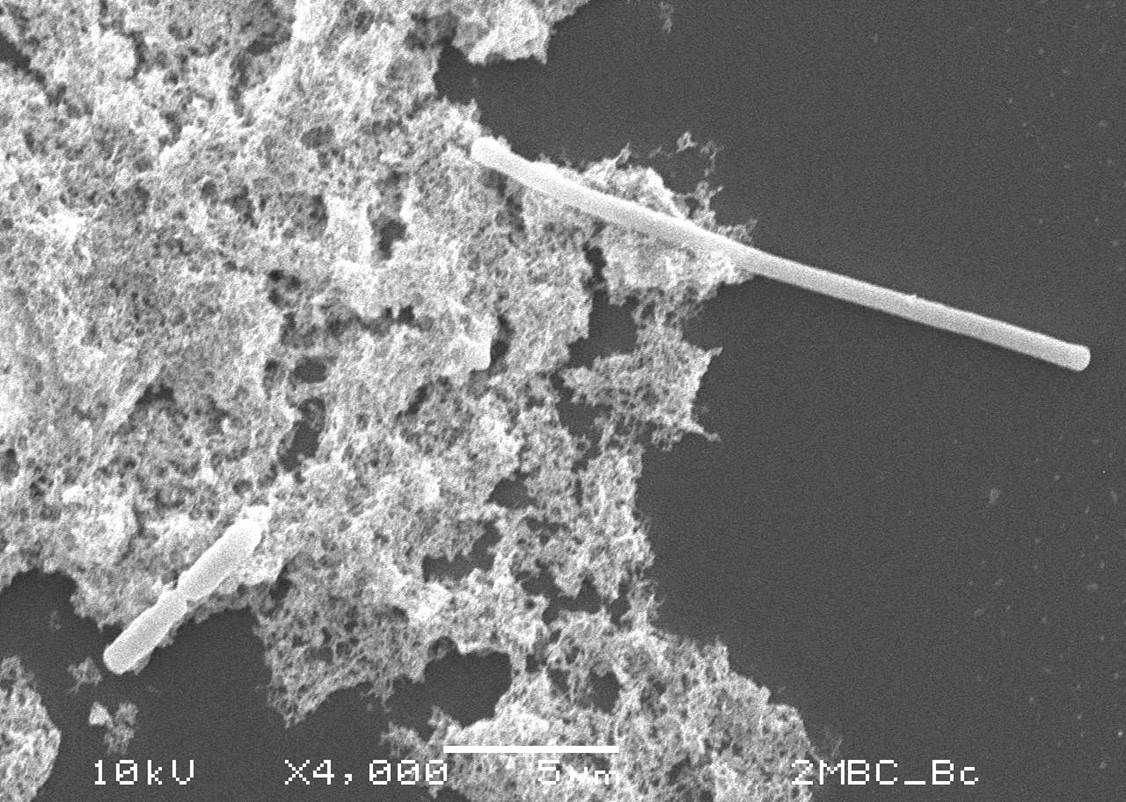
Filamentation (top right of electron micrograph) occurs in some bacteria when PBP3 is inhibited.

== See also ==
PASTA domain
