= Undecaprenyldiphospho-muramoylpentapeptide beta-N-acetylglucosaminyltransferase =

Class of enzymes

undecaprenyldiphospho-muramoylpentapeptide beta-N-acetylglucosaminyltransferase

Identifiers
- EC no.: 2.4.1.227
- CAS no.: 60976-26-3

Databases
- IntEnz: IntEnz view
- BRENDA: BRENDA entry
- ExPASy: NiceZyme view
- KEGG: KEGG entry
- MetaCyc: metabolic pathway
- PRIAM: profile
- PDB structures: RCSB PDB PDBe PDBsum
- Gene Ontology: AmiGO / QuickGO
Search
- PMC: articles
- PubMed: articles
- NCBI: proteins

In enzymology, an undecaprenyldiphospho-muramoylpentapeptide beta-N-acetylglucosaminyltransferase (EC 2.4.1.227) is an enzyme that catalyzes the chemical reaction

UDP-N-acetylglucosamine + Mur_{2}Ac(oyl-L-Ala-gamma-D-Glu-L-Lys-D-Ala-D-Ala)-diphosphoundecaprenol $\rightleftharpoons$ UDP + GlcNAc-(1->4)-Mur_{2}Ac(oyl-L-Ala-gamma-D-Glu-L-Lys-D-Ala-D-Ala)-diphosphoundecaprenol

The 2 substrates of this enzyme are UDP-N-acetylglucosamine and Mur2Ac(oyl-L-Ala-gamma-D-Glu-L-Lys-D-Ala-D-Ala)-diphosphoundecaprenol, whereas its 2 products are UDP and Lipid II.

This enzyme belongs to the family of glycosyltransferases, specifically the hexosyltransferases. The systematic name of this enzyme class is UDP-N-acetyl-D-glucosamine:N-acetyl-alpha-D-muramyl(oyl-L-Ala-gamma- D-Glu-L-Lys-D-Ala-D-Ala)-diphosphoundecaprenol beta-1,4-N-acetylglucosaminlytransferase. Another name in common use is MurG transferase. This enzyme participates in peptidoglycan biosynthesis.

Variant reactions producing modified cell walls include (not muturally exclusive):

- Replacement of lysine residue with meso-diaminopimelate combined with adjacent residues through its L-centre, as it is in Gram-negative and some Gram-positive organisms.
- Use of mono-trans,octa-cis-decaprenyl instead of the conventional di-trans,octa-cis-undecaprenol moiety, as found in Mycobacterium.
