= UDP-N-acetylmuramate dehydrogenase =

Class of enzymes

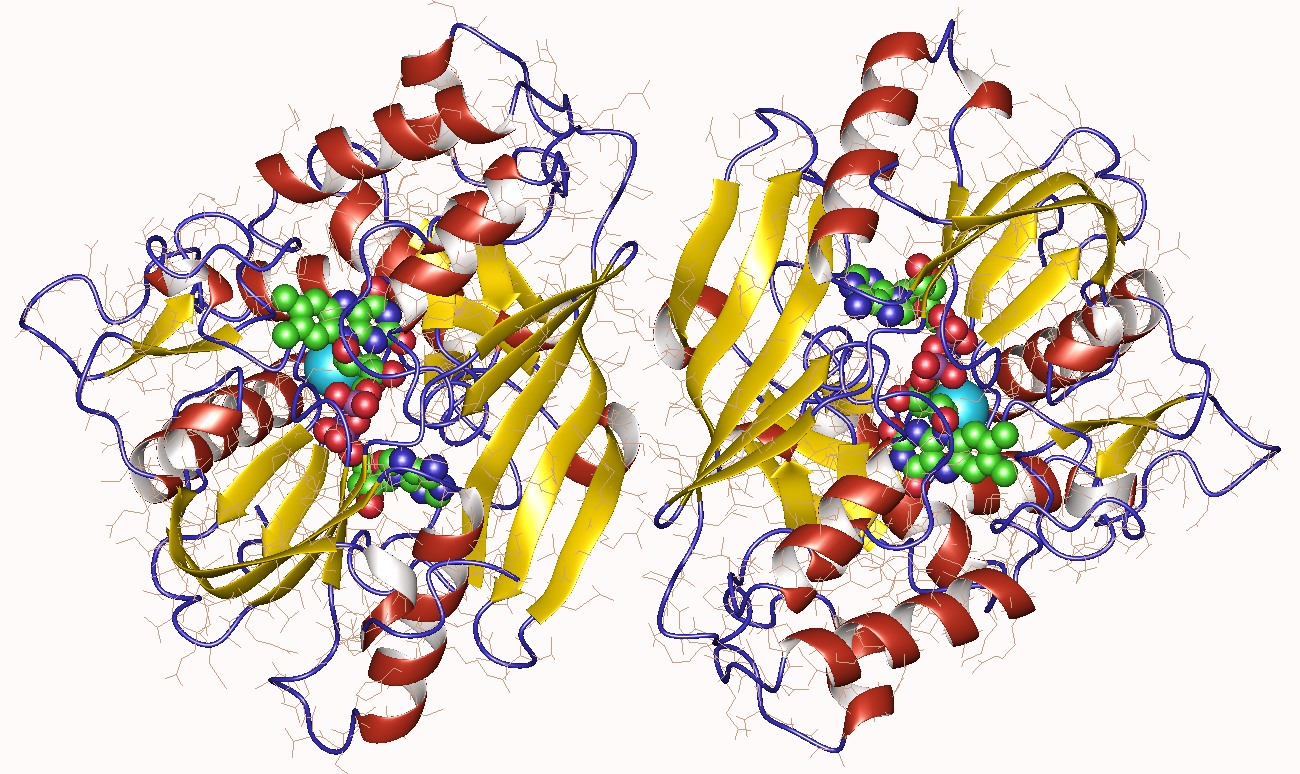
- UDP-N-acetylenolpyruvoylglucosamine reductase homodimer, Mycobacterium tuberculosis

Identifiers
- EC no.: 1.3.1.98
- CAS no.: 39307-28-3

Databases
- BRENDA: enzyme data
- ExPASy: NiceZyme view
- KEGG: enzyme entry
- MetaCyc: metabolic pathway
- Rhea: reactions
- PDB structures: RCSB PDB PDBe PDBsum
- Gene Ontology: AmiGO / QuickGO
Search
- PMC: articles
- PubMed: articles
- NCBI: proteins

In enzymology, an UDP-N-acetylmuramate dehydrogenase (EC 1.3.1.98) is an enzyme that catalyzes the chemical reaction

UDP-N-acetyl-alpha-D-muramate + NADP^{+} $\rightleftharpoons$ UDP-N-acetyl-3-O-(1-carboxyvinyl)-alpha-D-glucosamine + NADPH + H^{+}

Thus, the two substrates of this enzyme are UDP-N-acetyl-alpha-D-muramate and NADP^{+}, whereas its 3 products are UDP-N-acetyl-3-O-(1-carboxyvinyl)-alpha-D-glucosamine, NADPH, and H^{+}.

This enzyme belongs to the family of oxidoreductases, specifically those acting on the CH-CH group of donor with NAD^{+} or NADP^{+} as acceptor. The systematic name of this enzyme class is UDP-N-acetyl-alpha-D-muramate:NADP^{+} oxidoreductase. Other names in common use include MurB reductase, UDP-N-acetylenolpyruvoylglucosamine reductase, UDP-N-acetylglucosamine-enoylpyruvate reductase, UDP-GlcNAc-enoylpyruvate reductase, uridine diphosphoacetylpyruvoylglucosamine reductase, uridine diphospho-N-acetylglucosamine-enolpyruvate reductase, uridine-5'-diphospho-N-acetyl-2-amino-2-deoxy-3-O-lactylglucose:NADP-oxidoreductase. This enzyme participates in aminosugars metabolism. It employs one cofactor, FAD.

== Structural studies ==
As of late 2007, 8 structures have been solved for this class of enzymes, with PDB accession codes PDB: 1HSK, PDB: 1MBB, PDB: 1MBT, PDB: 1UXY, PDB: 2GQT, PDB: 2GQU, PDB: 2MBR, and PDB: 2Q85.
