= C55-isoprenyl pyrophosphate =

- Skeletal formula of C55-isoprenyl pyrophosphate n = 8

Names
- Preferred IUPAC name (2Z,6Z,10Z,14Z,18Z,22Z,26Z,30Z,34E,38E)-3,7,11,15,19,23,27,31,35,39,43-undecamethyltetratetraconta-2,6,10,14,18,22,26,30,34,38,42-undecaen-1-yl trihydrogen diphosphate
- Other names C55-undecaprenyl pyrophosphate; di-trans,poly-cis-undecaprenyl diphosphate; Undecaprenyl pyrophosphate; Pyrophosphoryl undecaprenol; Undecaisoprenyl pyrophosphate; Undecaprenyl diphosphate; Diphosphoundecaprenol; Bactoprenyl diphosphate

Identifiers
3D model (JSmol)	Interactive image
ChEBI	CHEBI:18197
ChemSpider	4444286
KEGG	C04574
PubChem CID	5280700
CompTox Dashboard (EPA)	DTXSID301343313
- InChI: InChI=1S/C55H92O7P2/c1-45(2)23-13-24-46(3)25-14-26-47(4)27-15-28-48(5)29-16-30-49(6)31-17-32-50(7)33-18-34-51(8)35-19-36-52(9)37-20-38-53(10)39-21-40-54(11)41-22-42-55(12)43-44-61-64(59,60)62-63(56,57)58/h23,25,27,29,31,33,35,37,39,41,43H,13-22,24,26,28,30,32,34,36,38,40,42,44H2,1-12H3,(H,59,60)(H2,56,57,58)/b46-25+,47-27+,48-29-,49-31-,50-33-,51-35-,52-37-,53-39-,54-41-,55-43- Key: NTXGVHCCXVHYCL-NTDVEAECSA-N
- SMILES: CC(=CCC/C(=C/CC/C(=C/CC/C(=C\CC/C(=C\CC/C(=C\CC/C(=C\CC/C(=C\CC/C(=C\CC/C(=C\CC/C(=C\COP(=O)(O)OP(=O)(O)O)/C)/C)/C)/C)/C)/C)/C)/C)/C)/C)C

Properties
Chemical formula	C_{55}H_{92}O_{7}P_{2}
Molar mass	927.282 g·mol^{−1}
- Except where otherwise noted, data are given for materials in their standard state (at 25 °C [77 °F], 100 kPa). verify (what is ?) Infobox references

C55-isoprenyl pyrophosphate (also known as undecaprenyl pyrophosphate or C55-PP) is an essential molecule involved in the construction of the bacterial peptidoglycan cell wall. It is a receptor found in the plasma membrane of bacteria allowing glycan tetrapeptide monomers synthesized in the cell cytoplasm to translocate to the periplasmic space.

C55-P (undecaprenyl phosphate) is a related compound, containing one fewer phosphate group. It is produced from C55-PP by reaction EC 3.6.1.27, typically catalyzed by UppP/BacA. C55-P is recycled back into C55-PP later in the process. C55-OH is known as bactoprenol.
