= UDP-N-acetylmuramoylalanyl-D-glutamate-2,6-diamino-pimelate ligase =

Class of enzymes

UDP-N-acetylmuramoyl-L-alanyl-D-glutamate—2,6-diaminopimelate ligase

Identifiers
- EC no.: 6.3.2.13
- CAS no.: 2620865

Databases
- IntEnz: IntEnz view
- BRENDA: BRENDA entry
- ExPASy: NiceZyme view
- KEGG: KEGG entry
- MetaCyc: metabolic pathway
- PRIAM: profile
- PDB structures: RCSB PDB PDBe PDBsum
Search
- PMC: articles
- PubMed: articles
- NCBI: proteins

UDP-N-acetylmuramoyl-L-alanyl-D-glutamate—2,6-diaminopimelate ligase (EC 6.3.2.13, MurE synthetase, UDP-N-acetylmuramoyl-L-alanyl-D-glutamate:meso-2,6-diamino-heptanedioate ligase (ADP-forming), UDP-N-acetylmuramoyl-L-alanyl-D-glutamyl-meso-2,6-diaminopimelate synthetase, UDP-N-acetylmuramoylalanyl-D-glutamate—2,6-diaminopimelate ligase) is an enzyme with systematic name UDP-N-acetylmuramoyl-L-alanyl-D-glutamate:meso-2,6-diaminoheptanedioate gamma-ligase (ADP-forming). This enzyme catalyses the following chemical reaction

ATP + UDP-N-acetylmuramoyl-L-alanyl-D-glutamate + meso-2,6-diaminoheptanedioate $\rightleftharpoons$ ADP + phosphate + UDP-N-acetylmuramoyl-L-alanyl-D-gamma-glutamyl-meso-2,6-diaminoheptanedioate

This enzyme takes part in synthesis of a cell-wall peptide.
