= Bactoprenol =

Names
- IUPAC name (6Z,10Z,14Z,18Z,22Z,26Z,30Z,34E,38E)-3,7,11,15,19,23,27,31,35,39,43-undecamethyltetratetraconta-6,10,14,18,22,26,30,34,38,42-decaen-1-ol
- Other names Dolichol-11

Identifiers
CAS Number	12777-41-2
3D model (JSmol)	Interactive image
ChemSpider	58837499
PubChem CID	91819839
- InChI: InChI=1S/C55H92O/c1-45(2)23-13-24-46(3)25-14-26-47(4)27-15-28-48(5)29-16-30-49(6)31-17-32-50(7)33-18-34-51(8)35-19-36-52(9)37-20-38-53(10)39-21-40-54(11)41-22-42-55(12)43-44-56/h23,25,27,29,31,33,35,37,39,41,55-56H,13-22,24,26,28,30,32,34,36,38,40,42-44H2,1-12H3/b46-25+,47-27+,48-29-,49-31-,50-33-,51-35-,52-37-,53-39-,54-41- Key: BNAIICFZMLQZKW-LSTWDCEHSA-N; InChI=1S/C55H92O/c1-45(2)23-13-24-46(3)25-14-26-47(4)27-15-28-48(5)29-16-30-49(6)31-17-32-50(7)33-18-34-51(8)35-19-36-52(9)37-20-38-53(10)39-21-40-54(11)41-22-42-55(12)43-44-56/h23,25,27,29,31,33,35,37,39,41,55-56H,13-22,24,26,28,30,32,34,36,38,40,42-44H2,1-12H3/b46-25+,47-27+,48-29-,49-31-,50-33-,51-35-,52-37-,53-39-,54-41- Key: BNAIICFZMLQZKW-LSTWDCEHSA-N
- SMILES: C/C(C)=C/CC/C(C)=C/CC/C(C)=C/CC/C(C)=C\CC/C(C)=C\CC/C(C)=C\CC/C(C)=C\CC/C(C)=C\CC/C(C)=C\CC/C(C)=C\CCC(C)CCO

Properties
Chemical formula	C_{55}H_{92}O
Molar mass	769.318 g·mol^{−1}
- Except where otherwise noted, data are given for materials in their standard state (at 25 °C [77 °F], 100 kPa). verify (what is ?) Infobox references

Bactoprenol also known as dolichol-11 and (isomerically vaguely) C55-isoprenyl alcohol (C55-OH) is a lipid first identified in certain species of lactobacilli. It is a hydrophobic alcohol that plays a key role in the growth of cell walls (peptidoglycan) in Gram-positive bacteria.

The double bonds all have the Z configuration except for the three ω-terminal ones, which are biosynthetically derived from (E,E)-farnesyl diphosphate.

== Occurrence ==
Bactoprenol is a lipid synthesized from mevalonic acid and is the most abundant lipid found in certain species of lactobacilli. Bactoprenol is found in both mesosomal and plasma membranes. Mesosomal and plasma bactoprenol are synthesized independently from each other.

== Function ==
Bactoprenol is thought to play a key role in the formation of cell walls in Gram-positive bacteria by cycling peptidoglycan monomers through the plasma membrane and inserting these monomers at points of growth in the bacterial cell wall.

== Antibiotic significance ==
Because bactoprenol is so important for cell growth, numerous antibiotic compounds function by disrupting the bactoprenol-mediated transportation pathway. This strategy was first identified by studying the antibiotic mechanism of friulimicin B. Since then, other antibiotics that make use of a similar mechanism have been identified, including nisin and lantibiotics such as NAI-107.

== See also ==
- Undecaprenyl phosphate
