= Undecaprenyl phosphate =

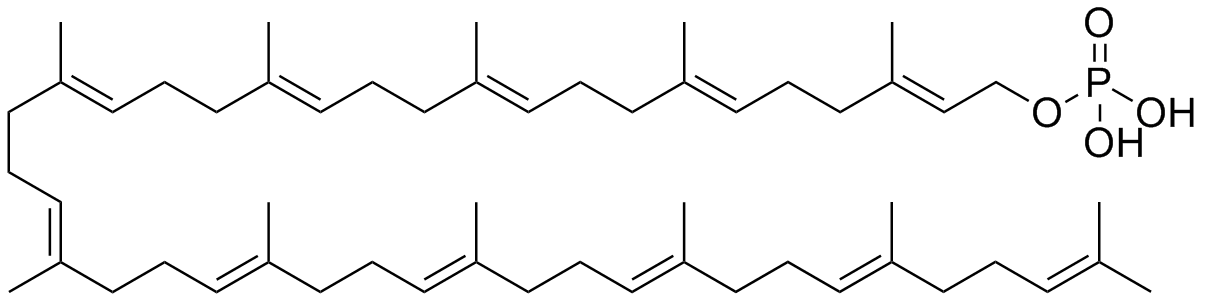

Names
- IUPAC name [(2E,6E,10E,14E,18E,22E,26E,30E,34E,38E)-3,7,11,15,19,23,27,31,35,39,43-undecamethyltetratetraconta-2,6,10,14,18,22,26,30,34,38,42-undecaenyl] dihydrogen phosphate
- Other names Undecaprenyl phosphate; 3,7,11,15,19,23,27,31,35,39,43-Undecamethyl-2,6,10,14,18,22,26,30,34,38,42-tetratetracontaun decaen-1-ol, dihydrogen phosphate

Identifiers
CAS Number	25126-51-6
3D model (JSmol)	Interactive image
ChEBI	CHEBI:16141
ChemSpider	4444049
KEGG	C00348
PubChem CID	5280338
- InChI: InChI=1S/C55H91O4P/c1-45(2)23-13-24-46(3)25-14-26-47(4)27-15-28-48(5)29-16-30-49(6)31-17-32-50(7)33-18-34-51(8)35-19-36-52(9)37-20-38-53(10)39-21-40-54(11)41-22-42-55(12)43-44-59-60(56,57)58/h23,25,27,29,31,33,35,37,39,41,43H,13-22,24,26,28,30,32,34,36,38,40,42,44H2,1-12H3,(H2,56,57,58)/b46-25+,47-27+,48-29+,49-31+,50-33+,51-35+,52-37+,53-39+,54-41+,55-43+ Key: UFPHFKCTOZIAFY-RDQGWRCRSA-N
- SMILES: CC(=CCC/C(=C/CC/C(=C/CC/C(=C/CC/C(=C/CC/C(=C/CC/C(=C/CC/C(=C/CC/C(=C/CC/C(=C/CC/C(=C/COP(=O)(O)O)/C)/C)/C)/C)/C)/C)/C)/C)/C)/C)C

Properties
Chemical formula	C_{55}H_{91}O_{4}P
Molar mass	847.303 g·mol^{−1}

Related compounds
Related compounds	C55-isoprenyl pyrophosphate
- Except where otherwise noted, data are given for materials in their standard state (at 25 °C [77 °F], 100 kPa). Infobox references

Undecaprenyl phosphate (UP), also known lipid-P, bactoprenol phosphate, and C55-P, is a molecule with the primary function of trafficking polysaccharides across the cell membrane, largely contributing to the overall structure of the cell wall in Gram-positive bacteria. In some situations, UP can also be utilized to carry other cell-wall polysaccharides, but UP is the designated lipid carrier for peptidoglycan. During the process of carrying the peptidoglycan across the cell membrane, N-acetylglucosamine and N-acetylmuramic acid are linked to UP on the cytoplasmic side of the membrane before being carried across. UP works in a cycle of phosphorylation and dephosphorylation as the lipid carrier gets used, recycled, and reacts with undecaprenyl phosphate. This type of synthesis is referred to as de novo synthesis where a complex molecule is created from simpler molecules as opposed to a complete recycle of the entire structure.

The synthesis of UP differs between Gram-negative and Gram-positive bacteria. In Gram-positive bacteria, undecaprenol is found in vast quantities, which is then phosphorylated into UP. For Gram-negative bacteria however, there has yet to be any indication that they contain any undecaprenol at all. Instead of having an undecaprenol be phosphorylated, it appears that instead, Gram-negative bacteria undergo a dephosphorylation of undecaprenyl diphosphate which is catalyzed by both a type-2 phosphatidic acid, phosphatase homologue, and a BacA homologue.

Undecaprenyl phosphate is also known to be the "Universal Glycan Lipid Carrier". When UP is inhibited, the peptidoglycan synthesis is interrupted and it could lead to cell lysis. Furthermore, UP is involved in the metabolism of many cellular processes that can potentially be targeted by antibiotics. Also, it is common for bacteria to use UP to translocate glycan; however, certain bacteria do not use undecaprenyl phosphate as a glycan translocator.

== Biosynthetic processes ==
=== Peptidoglycan synthesis ===
UP is involved in transporting peptidoglycan subunits from the cytoplasmic face of the cell membrane to the periplasmic or extracellular surface.

In the process, UP (also called lipid-P) complexes with UDP-N-acetylmuramic acid pentapeptide (UDP-NAM pentapeptide) to form lipid I, displacing UMP. From there, lipid I complexes with N-acetyl glucosamine (NAG) to form lipid II. Lipid II then is flipped across the membrane by a flippase to the outside leaflet of the cell membrane. The NAG-NAM pentapeptide subunit is then added onto the growing peptidoglycan chain, leaving behind undecaprenyl diphosphate. The extra phosphate on undecaprenyl diphosphate is cleaved by a pyrophosphatase and UP is then recycled to the cytoplasmic face of the cell membrane.

=== O-antigen synthesis in lipopolysaccharide assembly ===
UP also serves as the lipid transporter for the O-antigen component of lipopolysaccharide. It is supposed that sugars are assembled into O-antigen subunits directly on UP on the cytoplasmic surface of the cell membrane. Then the UP-O-antigen subunit gets flipped to the other side of the membrane, where similar UP-O-antigen subunits interact and aggregate the O-antigen subunits into repeating-subunit chains, leaving undecaprenyl diphosphate behind. Again undecaprenyl phosphate is recycled by a pyrophosphatase and flipped to the cytoplasmic face again.

== Inhibition ==
UP is a valuable transporter for cell wall equipment. That being said, the components necessary for the proper UP functioning can be inhibited, restricting the aiding of cell wall synthesis. As a result, the bacteria's structure is compromised, and its ability to combat lysing is lost. On a larger scale, this is helpful when fighting, or preventing bacterial infections.

Bacitracin is an example of one of these antibiotics. It is a generic topical cream used for "cuts, scrapes, and burns", possessing "bacteriostatic and bactericidal properties". The process is accomplished by targeting and inhibiting the enzyme used to renew UP—membrane-bound undecaprenyl phosphatase hydrolyzing undecaprenyl diphosphate to UP. This renewal process is crucial for maintaining the flow of lipid I and lipid II across the membrane, and without it, the cell wall synthesis process is halted.

Clomifene, a medication used to treat infertility in women, is another UP inhibitor discovered in the last decade. It has a similar process of cell wall disruption as bacitracin, resulting with lysis of cells.

While Bacitracin and clomiphene are not the only inhibitors out there, they are two on the evolving list that have been experimentally proven to inhibit pyrophosphatase.
