= BP holin family =

Class of transmembrane transport proteins

The β-proteobacterial holin (BP-Hol) family (TC# 1.E.50) is a small family that includes members derived from a number of Burkholderia phage as well as a Poloromonas species. As of April 3, 2016, this family belongs to the Holin superfamily II. Members of Saier Bioinformatics Lab at University of California, San Diego found that the BP-Hol family is most closely related to the T7 holin family (TC# 1.E.6). These proteins are of 60 to 110 amino acyl residues (aas) in length and exhibit 1 or 2 transmembrane segments (TMSs). Some are annotated as type II hollins and may be related to members of the T7 Holin family (TC# 1.E.6), although BP-Hol proteins remain functionally uncharacterized. A representative list of the proteins belonging to the BP-Hol family can be found in the Transporter Classification Database.

== See also ==
- Holin
- Lysin
- Transporter Classification Database
