= Flp/Fap Pilin putative holin family =

Class of transmembrane transport proteins

The Flp/Fap Pilin Putative Holin (FFPP-Hol) Family (TC# 1.E.52) is a large diverse family with members from many bacterial phyla. Some members are annotated as Flp or Fap pilin subunits; others are identified as Holin BlyA family members. They range in size of 50 to 80 amino acyl residues (aas) with a single N-terminal transmembrane segment (TMS) although one member has 99 aas and 2 TMSs (TC# 1.E.52.2.1). Flp homologues are included in TCDB under TC# 3.A.7.13.1 (pXO1-63) and TC# 3.A.7.15.1 (Flp-1). As in March 2016, their precise functions appear to be unknown. A representative list of proteins belonging to the FFPP-Hol family can be found in the Transporter Classification Database.

== See also ==
- Holin
- Lysin
- Transporter Classification Database
