= HP1 holin family =

The HP1 Holin (HP1 Holin) Family (TC# 1.E.7 ) is a member of the Holin Superfamily II. Proteins in this family are typically found to contain two transmembrane segments (TMSs) and range between 70 and 80 amino acyl residues (aas) in length. A representative list of proteins belonging to the HP1 holin family can be found in the Transporter Classification Database.

The NucE protein (TC# 1.E.25.2.1) in Serratia marcescens shows homology to phage holin proteins involved in releasing lysozyme to the peptidoglycan of Gram-negative bacteria. The protein contains two characteristic transmembrane segments (TMSs) with a positively charged C-terminus. When the nucC operon carrying the nucEDC genes is placed in the Escherichia coli chromosome, NucE functions as a holin. Additionally, NucE can complement lysis-defective bacteriophage mutants to allow for plaque formation and release of phage. Although NucE can function as a holin it is not involved in the transport of nuclease, an extracellular protein encoded by the nucA gene.

== See also ==
- Holin
- Lysin
- Transporter Classification Database
