= Holin superfamily II =

The Holin superfamily II is a superfamily of putative pore-forming proteins. It is one of the seven different holin superfamilies in total. In general, these proteins are thought to play a role in regulated cell death, although functionality varies between families and individual members. The Holin superfamily II includes the TC families:

- 1.E.1 - The P21 Holin S (P21 Holin) Family
- 1.E.6 - The T7 Holin (T7 Holin) Family
- 1.E.7 - The HP1 Holin (HP1 Holin) Family
- 1.E.25 - The Pseudomonas phage F116 Holin (F116 Holin) Family
- 1.E.50 - The Beta-Proteobacterial Holin (BP-Hol) Family

All four of these families are derived from Pseudomonadota and are of relatively small sizes, the average size of the proteins within the entire superfamily is 78 ± 14 amino acyl residues (aas). Some exceptions can be found (i.e., Lysis S family protein with 720 aas, TC# 1.E.1.1.7). As in holin superfamily I, proteins in these families generally exhibit of 2 transmembrane spanners (TMSs). Families 1 and 6 in Superfamily II are recognized domains in the Conserved Domains Database (CDD) as Lysis S and PHA00426 superfamilies, respectively, while families 7, and 25 lack recognized conserved domains.

== See also ==
- Holin
- Lysin
- Transporter Classification Database
