= M2 hol family =

The Mycobacterial 2 TMS Phage Holin (M2 Hol) Family (TC# 1.E.36) is a group of transporters belonging to the Holin Superfamily VII. The Mycobactrerial 2 transmembrane segment (TMS) Holins have been identified and recognized by Catalao et al (2012). The Mycobacterium phage D29 gp11 protein (TC# 1.E.36.1.7) is a holin that, upon expression, rapidly kills both E. coli and Mycobacterium smegmatis. Shortening gp11 from its C-terminus resulted in diminished cytotoxicity and smaller holes. The two TMSs at the N-terminus alone do not integrate into the cytoplasmic membrane and do not show toxicity. Fusion of the two TMSs and a small C-terminal coiled-coil region resulted in restoration of cell killing. The second TMS is dispensable for toxicity. The gp11 C-terminal region is therefore necessary but not sufficient for toxicity.

== See also ==
- Holin
- Lysin
- Transporter Classification Database
