= P21 holin family =

The Phage 21 S (P21 Holin) Family (TC# 1.E.1) is a member of the Holin Superfamily II.

The Bacteriophage P21 Lysis protein S holin (TC# 1.E.1.1.1) is the prototype for class II holins. Lysis S proteins have two transmembrane segments (TMSs), with both the N- and C-termini on the cytoplasmic side of the inner membrane. TMS1 may be dispensable for function.

A homologue of the P21 holin is the holin of bacteriophage H-19B (TC# 1.E.1.1.3). The gene encoding it has been associated with the Shiga-like Toxin I gene in E. coli. It may function in toxin export as has been proposed for the X. nematophila holin-1 (TC #1.E.2.1.4).

A representative list of proteins belonging to the P21 holin family can be found in the Transporter Classification Database.

== See also ==
- Holin
- Lysin
- Transporter Classification Database
