= Glycopeptide antibiotic =

Class of antibiotic drugs

Glycopeptide
- Drug class
- Vancomycin, a glycopeptide

Class identifiers
- Use: Bacterial infection
- ATC code: J01X
- Biological target: inhibit peptidoglycan synthesis

Clinical data
- Drugs.com: antibiotics.html Drug Classes

Legal status

Glycopeptide antibiotics are a class of drugs of microbial origin that are composed of glycosylated cyclic or polycyclic nonribosomal peptides. Significant glycopeptide antibiotics include the anti-infective antibiotics vancomycin, teicoplanin, telavancin, ramoplanin, avoparcin and decaplanin, corbomycin, complestatin and the antitumor antibiotic bleomycin. Vancomycin is used if infection with methicillin-resistant Staphylococcus aureus (MRSA) is suspected.

== Mechanism and classification ==
Some members of this class of drugs inhibit the synthesis of cell walls in susceptible microbes by inhibiting peptidoglycan synthesis. The core class (including vancomycin) binds to acyl-D-alanyl-D-alanine in lipid II, preventing the addition of new units to the peptidoglycan. Of this core class, one may distinguish multiple generations: the first generation includes vancomycin and teicoplanin, while the semisynthetic second generation includes lipoglycopeptides like telavancin, oritavancin and dalbavancin. The extra lipophilicity not only enhances Lipid II binding but also creates a second mechanism of action whereby the antibiotic dissolves into the membrane and makes it more permeable.

Corbomycin and complestatin are structurally and ancestrally related to vancomycin, but they work by inhibiting autolysins through binding to peptidoglycan, therefore preventing cell division, neither is an approved drug.

Ramoplanin, although a "glycopeptide" in the literal sense, has a quite different structural core. It not only binds to Lipid II but also attacks MurG and transglycosylases (glycosyltransferases) which polymerize amino acid/sugar building blocks into peptidoglycan. It has been described as a "first-in-class" antibiotic, representing glycolipodepsipeptide antibiotics.

Bleomycin also has a different core. Its mode of action is also unrelated to the cell wall, instead causing DNA damage in tumor cells.

== Use ==
Due to their toxicity, the use of first-generation glycopeptide antibiotics is restricted to patients who are critically ill, who have a demonstrated hypersensitivity to the β-lactams, or who are infected with β-lactam-resistant species, as in the case of methicillin-resistant Staphylococcus aureus. These antibiotics are effective principally against Gram-positive cocci. First-generation examples exhibit a narrow spectrum of action and are bactericidal only against the enterococci. Some tissues are not penetrated very well by glycopeptides, and they do not penetrate into the cerebrospinal fluid.

The second-generation glycopeptides, or "lipoglycopeptides", have better binding to Lipid II due to the lipophilic moieties, expanding the antibacterial spectrum. Telavancin also has a hydrophilic moiety attached to enhance tissue distribution and reduce nephrotoxicity.

== History ==
Vancomycin was isolated in 1953 and used clinically by 1958, while teicoplanin was discovered in 1978 and became clinically-available in 1984. Telavancin is a semi-synthetic lipoglycopeptide derivative of vancomycin approved by FDA in 2009.

Teicoplanin has historically been more widely marketed - and thus more used - in Europe compared to the U.S. It has more fatty acid chains than vancomycin and is considered to be 50 to 100 times more lipophilic. Teicoplanin also has an increased half-life compared to vancomycin, as well as having better tissue penetration. It can be two to four times more active than vancomycin, but it does depend upon the organism. Teicoplanin is more acidic, forming water-soluble salts, so it can be given intramuscularly. Teicoplanin is much better at penetrating leukocytes and phagocytes than vancomycin.

Since 2002, isolates of vancomycin-resistant Staphylococcus aureus (VRSA) have been found in the USA and other countries.

Glycopeptides have typically been considered the last effective line of defense for cases of MRSA, however, several newer classes of antibiotics have proven to have activity against MRSA- including, in 2000, linezolid of the oxazolidinone class, and in 2003 daptomycin of the lipopeptide class.

== Research ==
Several derivatives of vancomycin are currently being developed, including oritavancin and dalbavancin (both lipoglycopeptides). Possessing longer half-lives than vancomycin, these newer candidates may demonstrate improvements over vancomycin due to less frequent dosing and activity against vancomycin-resistant bacteria.

== Administration ==
Vancomycin is usually given intravenously, as an infusion, and can cause tissue necrosis and phlebitis at the injection site if given too rapidly. Pain at the site of injection is indeed a common adverse event. One of the side effects is red man syndrome, an idiosyncratic reaction to bolus caused by histamine release. Some other side-effects of vancomycin are nephrotoxicity including kidney failure and interstitial nephritis, blood disorders including neutropenia, and deafness, which is reversible once therapy has stopped. Over 90% of the dose is excreted in the urine, therefore there is a risk of accumulation in patients with renal impairment, so therapeutic drug monitoring (TDM) is recommended.

Oral preparations of vancomycin are available, however, they are not absorbed from the lumen of the gut, so are of no use in treating systemic infections. The oral preparations are formulated for the treatment of infections within the gastrointestinal tract, Clostridioides difficile, for example.
