= Pseudomonas phage F116 holin =

Protein and protein family produced by a bacterial virus

The Pseudomonas phage F116 holin is a non-characterized holin homologous to one in Neisseria gonorrheae that has been characterized. This protein is the prototype of the Pseudomonas phage F116 holin (F116 Holin) family (TC# 1.E.25), which is a member of the Holin Superfamily II. Bioinformatic analysis of the genome sequence of N. gonorrhoeae revealed the presence of nine probable prophage islands. The genomic sequence of FA1090 identified five genomic regions (NgoPhi1 - 5) that are related to dsDNA lysogenic phage. The DNA sequences from NgoPhi1, NgoPhi2 and NgoPhi3 contained regions of identity. A region of NgoPhi2 showed high similarity with the Pseudomonas aeruginosa generalized transducing phage F116. NgoPhi1 and NgoPhi2 encode functionally active phages. The holin gene of NgoPhi1 (identical to that encoded by NgoPhi2), when expressed in E. coli, could substitute for the phage lambda S gene.

== See also ==
- Holin
- Lysin
- Transporter Classification Database
