= Pseudomonas aeruginosa hol holin family =

Group of transporters

The Pseudomonas aeruginosa Hol Holin (Hol Holin) Family (TC# 1.E.20) is a group of transporters belonging to the Holin Superfamily III.

The hol gene (PRF9) product (117 aas) of Pseudomonas aeruginosa PAO1 exhibits a hydrophobicity profile similar to holins of P2 and φCTX phages with two peaks of hydrophobicity that might correspond to either one or two transmembrane segments (TMSs). Hol functions in conjunction with the lytic enzyme, Lys (PRF24; 209 amino acyl residues (aas)). Hol by itself, when expressed in a broad host-range expression vector under IPTG control exhibited strong lytic activity in both P. aeruginosa and E. coli. Expression of the lys gene plus chloroform (but not minus chloramphenicol) yielded cell lysis. In another expression vector, coexpression of hol and lys induced lysis under conditions where neither gene alone induced lysis. The hol-lys gene system therefore is believed to constitute a chromosomally-encoded autolysis system.

The reaction probably catalyzed by Hol is:

Autolysin (Lys)_{in} → Autolysin (Lys)_{out}.

== See also ==
- Holin
- Lysin
- Holin Superfamily III
- Transporter Classification Database
