= Hol118 family =

The Listeria Phage A118 Holin (Hol118) Family (TC# 1.E.21) is a group of transporters belonging to the Holin Superfamily V. A representative list of proteins belonging to the Hol118 family can be found in the Transporter Classification Database.

Listeria monocytogenes bacteriophage A118 encodes a native holin, hol118, of 93 amino acyl residues (aas) exhibiting 3 putative transmembrane segments (TMSs). When cloned into lambda phage devoid of the S holin, it caused very late cell lysis, beginning 80 min. after induction. Hol118 appeared in the cytoplasmic membrane shortly after infection. A second translational start codon (AUG-3) at nucleotide position 40 in the gene gives rise to a second gene product of 83 aas lacking TMS-1 (Hol118(83)). It is produced with the full length protein, appears in the membrane, but cannot support lambda lysis and inhibits lysis by Hol118. This dominant inhibitor presumably determines the time of lysis. A homologue is found in L. innocua.

The reaction probably catalyzed is:

small molecules + autolysin (in) → small molecules + autolysin (out)

== See also ==
- Holin
- Lysin
- Transporter Classification Database
