= Phi11 holin family =

The Phi11 Holin (φ11 Holin) Family (TC# 1.E.11) constitutes the Holin Superfamily I.

One characterized member of this family, pneumococcal EJ-1 phage holin (EJh; TC# 1.E.11.1.3), is a hydrophobic peptide of 85 amino acyl residues in length (aas) with 2 putative transmembrane segments (TMSs) displaying lethal inner membrane disruptive activity. The synthetic N-terminal TMS flanked by its N-terminal positively charged residues folds into a transmembrane α-helix that increases the membrane permeability. Oligomeric channels of various sizes form depending on the peptide to lipid ratio. By atomic force microscopy, peptide-induced membrane holes can be seen.

A representative list of proteins belonging to the φ11 holin family can be found in the Transporter Classification Database.

== See also ==
- Holin
- Lysin
- WikiGenes: holin
- Transporter Classification Database
