= LydA holin family =

The LydA Holin (LydA Holin) Family (TC# 1.E.4), named after the lydA gene which codes for its prototype member (LydA of E. coli; TC# 1.E.4.1.1), belongs to the Holin Superfamily III. Members of this family have 3 transmembrane segments (TMSs) and appear to possess between 90 and 120 amino acyl residues (aas). A representative list of proteins belonging to this family can be found in the Transporter Classification Database.

== See also ==
- Holin
- Lysin
- Transporter Classification Database
