= Brachyspira holin family =

Class of transmembrane transport proteins

The Brachyspira holin (B-Hol) Family (TC# 1.E.55) consists of several proteins from the GTA holin of Brachyspira hyodysenteriae (TC# 1.E.55.1.1), which facilitates gene transfer agent-release (see also GTA holin family) to VSH-1 holin of Brachyspira pilosicoli. VSH-1 is thought to participate in cell lysis. These proteins range in size from about 85 to 145 amino acyl residues (aas) and exhibit between 2 and 4 transmembrane segments (TMSs). A representative list of proteins belonging to the B-Hol family can be found in the Transporter Classification Database.

== See also ==
- Holin
- Lysin
- Transporter Classification Database
