= Putative actinobacterial holin-X family =

The putative actinobacterial holin-X (Hol-X) family (TC# 1.E.34) was retrieved as a distant member of TC family 1.E.20, suggesting membership of the holin superfamily III. Most Hol-X proteins are less than 200 amino acyl residues (aas) in length and possess two transmembrane segments (TMSs). A representative list of proteins belonging to this family can be found in the Transporter Classification Database.

== See also ==
- Holins
- Lysins
- Holin superfamily III
- Transporter Classification Database
