= Bacterial archaeal holin family =

Protein family

The Putative Bacterial Archaeal Holin (BAH) Family (TC# 9.B.185) consists of several uncharacterized proteins. However, these proteins were retrieved when functionally characterized holins from the T-A Hol family (TC# 1.E.43) were BLASTED against the NCBI database, and thus may be related to the T-A Hol family. Most BAH proteins are between 125 and 140 amino acyl residues (aas) in length and exhibit 4 transmembrane segments (TMSs), although at least one putative holin (TC# 9.B.185.1.4) is almost 260 aas long. A representative list of proteins belonging to the BAH family can be found in the Transporter Classification Database.

== See also ==
- Holin
- Lysin
- Transporter Classification Database
