= Deinococcus/Thermus holin family =

Family of transport proteins

The Deinococcus/Thermus Holin (D/T-Hol) Family (TC# 1.E.41) consists of a single protein with no close homologues (Putative holin of Meiothermus silvanus,TC# 1.E.41.1.1); however, its distant homology to members of the Holin superfamily III suggests an evolutionary relationship. The putative holin of Meiothermus silvanus is 108 amino acyl residues in length and possesses 3 transmembrane segments.

== See also ==
- Holins
- Lysins
- Holin superfamily III
- Transporter Classification Database
