= Lambda holin family =

The Lambda Holin S (λ Holin) Family (TC# 1.E.2) is a group of integral membrane transporter proteins belonging to the Holin Superfamily III. Members of this family generally consist of the characteristic three transmembrane segments (TMSs) and are of 110 amino acyl residues (aas) in length, on average. A representative list of members belonging to this family can be found in the Transporter Classification Database.

== Lambda Holin S ==
Lambda holin S (Lysis protein S of phage lambda, holin S105; TC# 1.E.2.1.1) is the prototype for class I holins. It has 3 TMSs with the N-terminus in the periplasm and the C-terminus in the cytoplasm. Its 107 codon sequence encodes two proteins with opposing functions, the holin, S105, and the holin inhibitor, S107. The latter protein, S107, is a 2-amino acid extension of the former protein, S105, due to a different translational initiation start site (M1-K2-M3 vs. M3). A cationic amino acid at position 2 is largely responsible for the inhibiting effect of S107. The ratio of S105 to S107 influences the timing of phage lambda-induced cell lysis. The highly hydrophilic C-terminal domains of holins (e.g., lambda S105) have been shown to be localized cytoplasmically and serve as regulatory domains. Like the N-terminal 2 amino acid extension in S107, they influence the timing of lysis by a charge dependent mechanism.

=== Mechanism ===
Expression of holin S at a precisely scheduled time after phage infection terminates respiration and allows release of a muralytic enzyme, endolysin, that hydrolyzes the cell wall. Point mutations in the S gene that prevent lethality alter TMSs 1 and 2 and the connecting loop. TMS 2 is particularly important for function. A three-step mechanism (monomer → dimer → oligomeric pore) has been proposed for assembly of the pore. S105 (holin) and S107 (inhibitor) form an abortive dimer. Only when S105 production exceeds that of S107 (which occurs at a specific developmental time), do functional holes appear in the bacterial cell membrane. For holin S105, the helix-turn-helix motif in transmembrane domain 3 provides the driving force of dimerization.

Holins regulate the length of the infection cycle of tailed phages (caudovirales) by oligomerizing to form lethal holes in the cytoplasmic membrane at a time dictated by their primary structures. Savva et al. (2008) used electron microscopy and single-particle analysis to characterize structures formed by the bacteriophage lambda holin (S105) in vitro. In non-ionic or mild zwitterionic detergents, purified S105, but not the lysis-defective variant S105A52V, formed rings of at least two size classes, the most common having inner and outer diameters of 8.5 and 23 nm respectively, and containing approximately 72 S105 monomers. The height of these rings, 4 nm, closely matches the thickness of the lipid bilayer. The central channel is of unprecedented size for channels formed by integral membrane proteins, consistent with the non-specific nature of holin-mediated membrane permeabilization. S105, present in detergent-solubilized rings and in inverted membrane vesicles, showed similar sensitivities to proteolysis and cysteine-specific modification, suggesting that the rings are representative of the lethal holes formed by S105 to terminate the infection cycle and initiate lysis.

== Homologues ==
A homologue of λ holin S from the lysogenic Xenorhabdus nematophila, hol-1 (TC #1.E.2.1.4), has been shown to be a functional holin. When cloned into wild-type E. coli, it causes hemolysis due to the release of the SheA hemolysin. Another holin (phage H-19B holin) is encoded by a gene associated with the Shiga-like toxin I gene of E. coli. Thus, it appears that holins can export various toxins as well as autolysins.

The holes caused by S105 have an average diameter of 340 nm, and some exceeding 1 micron. Most cells exhibit only one irregular hole, randomly positioned in the membrane, irrespective of its size. During λ infection, S105 accumulates harmlessly in the membrane until it forms a single irregular hole, releasing the endolysin from the cytoplasm, resulting in lysis within seconds. Using a functional S105-GFP fusion, it was demonstrated that the protein accumulates uniformly in the membrane, and then within 1 minute, it forms aggregates at the time of lethality. Thus, like bacteriorhodopsin, the protein accumulates until it reaches a critical concentration for nucleation.

== See also ==
- Lambda phage
- Holin
- Lysin
- Transporter Classification Database
