= Hol44 family =

The Holin Hol44 (Hol44) Family (TC# 1.E.29) is a group of transporters belonging to the Holin Superfamily V. A representative list of proteins belonging to the Hol44 family from caudovirales and Bacillota can be found in the Transporter Classification Database.

One characteristic member of the Hol44 family is oenophage fOg44 (Lys44; TC# 1.E.29.2.1), which secretes an endolysin that Oenococcus oeni cells are intrinsically resistant to. Full activity of Lys44 requires dissipation of the proton motive force induced by fOg44 holin during phage infection.

== See also ==
- Holin
- Lysin
- Transporter Classification Database
