= P68 =

P68 may refer to:

== Vessels ==
- HMS Venturer (P68), a submarine of the Royal Navy and, as HNoMS Utstein (P68), of the Royal Norwegian Navy
- INS Arnala (P68), two ships of the Indian Navy
- RSS Panglima of the Republic of Singapore Navy

== Other uses ==
- DDX5, RNA helicase p68
- Ford P68, a racing car
- NetBurst
- P68 holin family
- Papyrus 68, a biblical manuscript
- Partenavia P.68, or Vulcanair P68, an Italian light aircraft
- Vultee XP-68 Tornado, a proposed American high-altitude interceptor aircraft
- P68, a state regional road in Latvia
