= CidA/LrgA holin =

Class of transmembrane transport proteins

The CidA/LrgA Holin (CidA/LrgA Holin) Family (TC# 1.E.14) is a group of proteins named after CidA (TC# 1.E.14.1.2) and LrgA (TC# 1.E.14.1.1) of Staphylococcus aureus. CidA and LrgA are homologous holin and anti-holin proteins, each with 4 putative transmembrane segments (TMSs). Members of the CidA/LrgA holin family also include putative murine hydrolase exporters from a wide range of Gram-positive and Gram-negative bacteria as well as archaea. Most CidA/LrgA holin family proteins vary in size between 100 and 160 amino acyl residues (aas) in length although a few are larger.

== Function ==
It has been proposed that CidA and CidB (23% and 32% identical to LrgA and LrgB, respectively) are involved in programmed cell death in a process that is analogous to apoptosis in eukaryotes. These proteins are known to regulate and influence biofilm formation by releasing DNA from lysed cells which contributes to the biofilm matrix. CidA, a 131 aa protein with 4 putative TMSs, is believed to be the holin which exports the autolysin CidB, while LrgA may be an anti-holin, a protein that binds and inhibits holin activity. If this is a general mechanism for programmed cell death, this would explain their near ubiquity in the prokaryotic world.

== Expression ==
The cidABC operon is activated by CidR in the presence of acetic acid. Both CidAB and LrgAB affect biofilm formation, oxidative stress, stationary phase survival and antibiotic tolerance in a reciprocal fashion, and their genes are regulated by the LytSR two component regulatory system. Microfluidic techniques have been used to follow gene expression temporally and spatially during biofilm formation, revealing that both cidA and lrgA are expressed mostly in the interior of tower structures in the biofilms, regulated by oxygen availability. Analogous proteins may be linked to competence in S. mutants.

== See also ==
- Holin
- Lysin
- Transporter Classification Database
