= PhiU53 holin family =

Class of transmembrane transport proteins

The Firmicute Phage φU53 Holin (φU53 Holin) Family (TC# 1.E.13) consists of putative holins that range in size from 117 to 124 amino acyl residues (aas) in length and exhibit 3 transmembrane segments (TMSs) found in Bacillota phage. While annotated as holins, it appears as though many members of the φU53 holin family are not yet functionally characterized. A representative list of homologues can be found in the Transporter Classification Database.

== See also ==
- Holin
- Lysin
- Transporter Classification Database
