= 2/3 holin family =

The 2 or 3 TMS Putative Holin (2/3 Holin) Family (TC# 1.E.33) consists of many bacterial proteins ranging in size from about 70 to 120 amino acyl residues (aas) in length that exhibit 2 or 3 predicted transmembrane segments (TMSs). Although annotated as holins, these proteins are not yet functionally characterized. A representative list of proteins belonging to the 2/3 Holin family can be found in the Transporter Classification Database.

== See also ==
- Holin
- Lysin
- Transporter Classification Database
