= A-1 holin family =

Class of transmembrane transport proteins

The Actinobacterial 1 TMS Holin (A-1 Holin) Family (TC# 1.E.32) consists of proteins found in actinobacteria, their conjugative plasmids and their phage. They are usually between 90 and 140 amino acyl residues (aas) in length and exhibit 1 or sometimes even 2 transmembrane segments despite the families name (i.e., TC# 1.E.32.2.1). Although some are annotated as phage proteins or holins, members of the A-1 family are not yet functionally characterized. A representative list of proteins belonging to the A-1 Holin family can be found in the Transporter Classification Database (TCDB).

== See also ==
- Holin
- Lysin
- Transporter Classification Database
