= Arnala =

Arnala may refer to:

- Arnala fort, coastal fort in Maharashtra, India
- Arnala-class corvette, a ship class of the Indian Navy
  - INS Arnala, ships of the Indian Navy
- Arnala Island, an island off the coast of Palghar district, Maharashtra, India
