= Holin superfamily V =

The Holin superfamily V is a superfamily of integral membrane transport proteins. It is one of the seven different holin superfamilies in total. In general, these proteins are thought to play a role in regulated cell death, although functionality varies between families and individual members. The Holin superfamily V includes the TC families:

- 1.E.21 - The Listeria Phage A118 Holin (Hol118) Family
- 1.E.29 - The Holin Hol44 (Hol44) Family

Superfamily V includes protein families classified in the Transporter Classification Database as TC# 1.E.21 and TC# 1.E.29. Both families possess members from Bacillota, Actinomycetota and Chloroflexota. Proteins of this superfamily all appear to have 3 transmembrane segments (TMSs) and have average sizes of 97 and 101 amino acyl residues (aas), respectively.

== See also ==
- Holin
- Lysin
- Transporter Classification Database
