= Phage r1t holin family =

Family of putative pore-forming proteins

The Lactococcus lactis Phage r1t Holin (r1t Holin) Family (TC# 1.E.18) is a family of putative pore-forming proteins that typically range in size between about 65 and 95 amino acyl residues (aas) in length, although a few r1t holins have been found to be significantly larger (i.e., 168 aa, 4 TMS, uncharacterized holin of Rhodococcus opacus; TC# 1.E.18.1.9). Phage r1t holins exhibit between 2 and 4 transmembrane segments (TMSs), with the 4 TMS proteins resulting from an intragenic duplication of a 2 TMS region. A representative list of the proteins belonging to the r1t holin family can be found in the Transporter Classification Database.

== Function and expression ==
The Lactococcus lactis phage r1t genome includes two adjacent genes, orf48 and orf49, which encode Orf48 (TC# 1.E.18.1.1; 75 aas) and a lysin Orf49 (270 aas), probably an N-acetyl-muramoyl-L-alanine amidase, respectively. Orf48 exhibits 2 putative hydrophobic transmembrane segments (TMSs) separated by a short β-turn region. It also has a hydrophobic N-terminus and a highly charged C-terminus. Orf48/Orf49 constitute the phage r1t lysis cassette. An essential role of Orf49 in cell lysis by Orf48 has been demonstrated.

Orf48 is homologous to the Gp4 holin of Mycobacterium phage Ms6 (TC# 1.E.18.1.2). Like most double-stranded (ds) DNA phages, mycobacteriophage Ms6 uses the holin-endolysin system to achieve lysis of its host. In addition to endolysin (lysA) and holin (hol) genes, Ms6 encodes three accessory lysis proteins. The lysis function of Gp1, encoded by the gp1 gene that lies immediately upstream of lysA, was revealed.

Catalão et al. observed Escherichia coli lysis after coexpression of LysA and Gp1 in the absence of the Ms6 holin. Gp1 does not belong to the holin class of proteins, but it shares several characteristics with molecular chaperones. The authors suggest that Gp1 interacts with LysA, and that this interaction is necessary for LysA delivery to its target. PhoA fusions showed that in Mycobacterium smegmatis, LysA is exported to the extracytoplasmic environment in the presence of Gp1 which is necessary for efficient M. smegmatis lysis, as Ms6 gp1 deletion results in host lysis defects. Catalao et al. proposed that delivery of Ms6 endolysin to the murein layer is assisted by Gp1, a chaperone-like protein, in a holin-independent manner.

The transport reaction catalyzed by phage r1t Orf48 is:

lysin (in) → lysin (out)

== See also ==
- Holin
- Lysin
- Transporter Classification Database
