= SPP1 holin family =

Class of transmembrane transport proteins

The SPP1 Holin (SPP1 Holin) Family (TC# 1.E.31) consists of proteins of between 90 and 160 amino acyl residues (aas) in length that exhibit two transmembrane segments (TMSs). SPP1 is a double-stranded DNA phage that infects the Gram-positive bacteria. Although annotated as holins, members of the SPP1 family are not yet functionally characterized. A representative list of proteins belonging to the SPP1 Holin family can be found in Transporter Classification Database.

== See also ==
- Holin
- Lysin
- Transporter Classification Database
