= 3-Hol family =

The Putative 3 TMS Holin (3-Hol) Family (TC# 1.E.56) is large, consisting of many members derived from Pseudomonadota and their phage, all of small size (85-105 amino acyl residues in length) and usually with 3 transmembrane segments (TMSs). A representative list of the proteins belonging to this family can be found in the Transporter Classification Database. While many of the proteins belonging to this family are annotated in holins, they remain functionally uncharacterized.

== See also ==
- Holin
- Lysin
- Transporter Classification Database
