= Actinobacterial phage holin family =

Class of transmembrane transport proteins

The Actinobacterial Phage Holin (APH) Family (TC# 1.E.57) is a fairly large family of proteins between 105 and 180 amino acyl residues in length, typically exhibiting a single transmembrane segment (TMS) near the N-terminus. A representative list of proteins belonging to the APH family can be found in the Transporter Classification Database.

One of the archetype proteins in this family is the Gp5 holin of mycobacteriophage Ms6. Mycobacteriophage Ms6 is a double-stranded DNA (dsDNA) bacteriophage which, in addition to the predicted endolysin (LysA)-holin (Gp4) lysis system, encodes three additional proteins within its lysis module: Gp1, LysB, and Gp5.

Ms6 Gp4 (TC# 1.E.18.1.2) was previously described as a class II holin-like protein. A second putative holin gene (gp5) encoding a protein (Gp5) with a predicted single N-terminal TMS was identified at the end of the Ms6 lytic operon. Neither the putative class II holin nor the single TMS polypeptide could trigger lysis in pairwise combinations with the endolysin LysA in Escherichia coli. However, further studies have shown that Ms6's Gp4 and Gp5 interact with each other. This suggests that in Ms6 infection, the correct and programmed timing of lysis is achieved by the combined action of Gp4 and Gp5.

== See also ==
- Actinobacteria
- Holin
- Lysin
- Transporter Classification Database
