= T4 holin =

Class of transmembrane transport proteins

The T4 Holin Family (TC# 1.E.8) is a group of putative pore-forming proteins that does not belong to one of the seven holin superfamilies. T-even phage such as T4 use a holin-endolysin system for host cell lysis. Although the endolysin of phage T4 encoded by the e gene (Lysozyme E) was identified in 1961, the holin (product of gene t and called T-holin) was not characterized until 2001. A representative list of proteins belonging to the T4 holin family can be found in the Transporter Classification Database.

== Structure ==
T4 holin is fairly large, about 218 amino acyl residues (aas) in length. The protein is highly hydrophilic with 49 acidic and basic residues distributed along its length and a single putative transmembrane segment (TMS) near its N-terminus, leaving most of the protein in the periplasm.

== Function ==
The large periplasmic domain is a major determinant in the timing mechanism and is involved in lysis inhibition (LIN). LIN involves the antiholin rI protein of T4 (See TC# 1.E.8.1.1). Lysis inhibition is an effective strategy to coordinate lysis timing with phage particle maturation and to exclude other phage. The C-terminal periplasmic domain of T4 holin binds the periplasmic domain of T4 antiholin (RI; 97 aas) which like the holin, spans the membrane once. T-holin of T4 phage forms a 1:1 complex with the RI inhibitor which block aggregation and pore formation.

== Homology ==
The phage T4 T-holin (lysis protein) is identical to the holin from phage K3 and nearly identical to that from phage ARI. Residues 35-96 are 28% identical to residues 436-495 of a K^{+} uptake protein of Lactococcus lactis (gbAAK04721; TC# 2.A.72; KUP), suggesting an evolutionary relationship between a holin and a transporter. Holins have 1 to 4 TMSs and a short C-terminal domain rich in basic residues.

== See also ==
- Holin
- Lysin
- Transporter Classification Database
