= L2 holin family =

Class of transmembrane transport proteins

The Putative Acholeplasma Phage L2 Holin (L2 Holin) Family (TC# 1.E.59) consists of a putative holin (TC# 1.E.59.1.1; 81 amino acyl residues (aas) and 2 transmembrane segments (TMSs)) and a homologous uncharacterized protein (TC# 1.E.59.1.2; 75 aas and 2 TMSs). These proteins are of particular interest because they may show a link between prokaryotic holins and eukaryotic virus viroporins. While functionally uncharacterized, this putative holin (TC# 1.E.59.1.1) comes up in BLAST searches when members of viroporin families TC# 1.A.95 and TC# 1.A.100 are used as query sequences.

== See also ==
- Holin
- Lysin
- Transporter Classification Database
