= Lysibody =

Although cell wall carbohydrates are ideal immunotherapeutic targets due to their abundance in bacteria and high level of conservation, their poor immunogenicity compared with protein targets complicates their use for the development of protective antibodies. A lysibody is a chimeric antibody in which the Fab region is the binding domain from a bacteriophage lysin, or the binding domain from an autolysin or bacteriocin, all of which bind to bacterial cell wall carbohydrate epitopes. This is linked to the Fc of Immunoglobulin G (IgG). The chimera forms a stable homodimer held together by hinge-region disulfide bonds. Thus, lysibodies are homodimeric hybrid immunoglobulin G molecules that can bind with high affinity and specificity to a carbohydrate substrate in the bacterial cell wall peptidoglycan. Lysibodies behave like authentic IgG by binding at high affinity to their bacterial wall receptor, fix complement and therefore promote phagocytosis by macrophages and neutrophils, protecting mice from infection in model systems. Since cell wall hydrolases, autolysins and bacteriocins are ubiquitous in nature, production of lysibodies specific for difficult to treat pathogenic bacteria is possible.

Binding domains may be linked to either the N-terminus of the IgG Fc (as is the case for autolysins) or to the C-terminus (as seen with phage lysins - see figure). In both cases the binding domains are able to bind their substrates in the bacterial cell wall and the Fc is able to perform its effector functions (see ref 2 for more detail).

Lysibodies may be used prophylactically to help protect surgical patients from bacterial infections, particularly methicillin resistant Staphylococcus aureus (MRSA) and boost immune clearance in infected individuals.

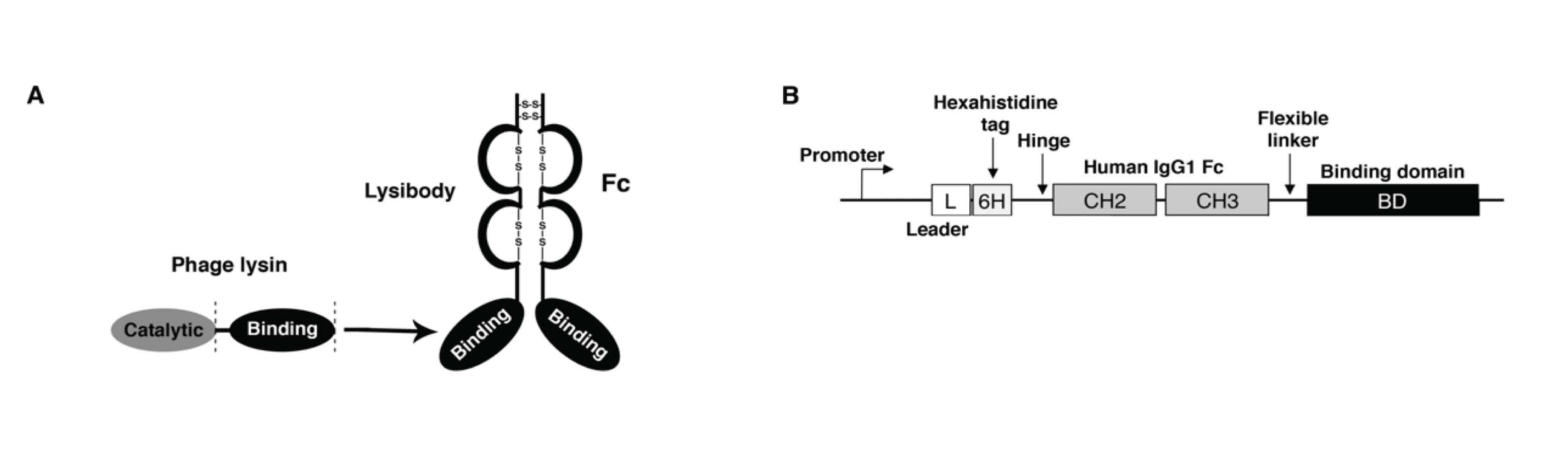
