= Mu1/6 holin family =

Family of transport proteins

The Streptomyces aureofaciens Phage Mu1/6 Holin (Mu1/6 Holin) Family (TC# 1.E.28) is a family of putative pore-forming holins between 80 and 90 amino acyl residues in length with 2 transmembrane segments (TMSs). A representative list of proteins belonging to this family can be found in the Transporter Classification Database.

== See also ==
- Streptomyces aureofaciens
- Holin
- Lysin
