= ArpQ holin family =

Class of transmembrane transport proteins

The ArpQ Holin (ArpQ Holin) Family (TC# 1.E.15) consists of a single holin-like protein 58 amino acyl residues (aas) in length with 2 transmembrane segments (TMSs). This protein is encoded by the arpQ gene in Enterococcus hirae. While annotated as a holin, it is not functionally characterized.

== See also ==
- Holin
- Lysin
- Transporter Classification Database
