= Holin LLH family =

The holin LLH family (TC# 1.E.26) is a group of transporters belonging to the Holin superfamily VI. The Holin LLH family is found in Bacillota and phage of Bacillota as well as other bacteria. Members are fairly large, between 100 and 160 amino acyl residues in length, and have an N-terminal transmembrane segment (TMS). Some proteins, such as putative holin of Fusobacterium varium (TC# 1.E.26.7.2), may exhibit 2 TMSs. A representative list of proteins belonging to the Holin LLH family can be found in the Transporter Classification Database.

== See also ==
- Holin/Holin Superfamilies
- Lysin
- Transporter Classification Database
