= LP holin family =

Class of transmembrane transport proteins

The Putative Listeria Phage Holin (LP-Hol) Family (TC# 1.E.51) consists of several small proteins of 41 amino acyl residues (aas) and 1 transmembrane segment (TMS). They can be found in several Listeria phage as well as in Listeria monocytogenes. While annotated as holins, these proteins remain functionally uncharacterized. A representative list of proteins belonging to the LP-Hol family can be found in the Transporter Classification Database.

== See also ==
- Holin
- Lysin
- Transporter Classification Database
