= LLH =

LLH may refer to

- Hospitals
  - Life-Line Hospital, a hospital in Damak of Jhapa, Nepal
  - LLH Hospital, one of the hospitals in the United Arab Emirates
- Schools
  - Las Lomas High School, a school in Walnut Creek, California
  - Los Lunas High School, a school in Valencia County, New Mexico
  - Lycée La Liberté Héliopolis, a school in Cairo, Egypt
- Other meanings
  - Holin LLH family, a group of transporters in bacteria
  - Landsforeningen for lesbiske, homofile, bifile og transpersoner, the former name of the National Association for Lesbians, Gays, Bisexuals and Transgender People, a Norwegian organization
  - La Lima Airport, an airport serving the town of La Lima in Cortés Department, Honduras, with the IATA airport code LLH
