= NP-holin family =

Class of transmembrane transport proteins

The Neisserial Phage-associated Holin (NP-Holin) Family (TC# 1.E.22) is a family of small proteins, between 47–53 amino acyl residues in length, that exhibit a single N-terminal transmembrane segment (TMS). Although annotated as phage proteins or holins, NP-Holin proteins are not yet functionally characterized, thus more research is needed to confirm holin activity. A representative list of proteins belonging to the NP-Holin family can be found in the Transporter Classification Database.

== See also ==
- Holin
- Lysin
- Transporter Classification Database
