= Enterobacterial holin family =

Class of transmembrane transport proteins

The Enterobacterial Holin (EBHol) Family (TC# 1.E.48) consists of many closely related proteins of 100 to 120 amino acyl residues (aas) in length with a single C-terminal transmembrane segment (TMS). They derive from γ-proteobacteria of many genera: Salmonella, Escherichia, Klebsiella and Photorhabdus, and their phage. As of March 2016, these proteins have not been functionally characterized. A representative list of proteins belonging to the EBHol family can be found in the Transporter Classififcation Database.

== See also ==
- Enterobacteriales
- Holin
- Lysin
- Transporter Classification Database
