= XanPHol family =

Class of transmembrane transport proteins

The Xanthomonas Phage Holin (XanPHol) Family (TC# 1.E.45) consists of a single protein (Putative holin; TC# 1.E.45.1.1) of 64 amino acyl residues (aas) in length with 2 transmembrane segments (TMSs). It is a putative uncharacterized protein from Xanthomonas phage Xp15. This protein corresponds to sequence 68 from patent US 7919601 ('Identification and use of genes encoding holins and holin-like proteins in plants for the control of microbes and pests'). As of March 2016, this protein does not show appreciable sequence similarity to any other proteins in the NCBI protein database.

== See also ==
- Holin
- Lysin
- Transporter Classification Database
