= Bacillus spore morphogenesis and germination holin family =

Class of transmembrane transport proteins

The Bacillus Spore Morphogenesis and Germination Holin (BSH) Family (TC# 1.E.23) is a family of proteins named after a holin in Bacillus subtilis described to be involved in spore morphogenesis and germination by Real et al (2005). The gene encoding this holin is ywcE. Mutants lacking this gene or its product have spores that exhibit outer coat defects. These spores lack the characteristic striatal pattern resulting in the failure of the outer coat to attach to the underlying inner coat. Finally, the mutant spores accumulate reduced amounts of dipicolinic acid. BSH proteins average about 90 amino acyl residues in length and exhibit 3 transmembrane segments (TMSs). A representative list of homologous proteins, found only in Bacillus species, is available in the Transporter Classification Database.

== See also ==
- Holin
- Lysin
- Transporter Classification Database
