= BhlA holin family =

The BhlA Holin Family (TC# 1.E.27) is named after putative holin-like peptides encoded in bacteria with bacteriocin similarities. BhlA proteins are generally about 67 to 80 amino acyl residues (aas) in length and exhibit a single N-terminal transmembrane segment (TMS). BhlA (TC# 1.E.27.1.4). It has an antibacterial activity against Gram-positive bacteria. A representative list of proteins belonging to this family can be found in the Transporter Classification Database.

== See also ==
- Holin
- Lysin
- Transporter Classification Database
