= Hol-Tox family =

Class of transmembrane transport proteins

The putative holin-like toxin (Hol-Tox) family (TC# 1.E.42) consists of many small proteins, between 34 and 48 amino acyl residues (aas) with a single transmembrane segment (TMSs). Rajesh et al. (2011) first identified the gene and designated it tmp1, which coded for a 34 amino acyl peptide that acts as an antibacterial agent on gram-positive bacteria. This peptide exhibits a single transmembrane domain (TMD) that is believed to play a role in facilitating the antibacterial activity. A representative list of proteins belonging to the Hol-Tox family can be found in the Transporter Classification Database.

== See also ==
- Holin
- Lysin
