= Holin superfamily VII =

The Holin superfamily VII is a superfamily of integral membrane transport proteins. It is one of the seven different holin superfamilies in total. In general, these proteins are thought to play a role in regulated cell death, although functionality varies between families and individual members.

The Holin superfamily VII includes one TC family:

- 1.E.36 - The Mycobacterial 2 TMS Phage Holin (M2 Hol) Family

Superfamily VII consists of family TC# 1.E.36, which has six subfamilies, all distantly related to each other. Reddy and Saier (2013) found that there was also some indication that this family could possibly be related to the SPP1 Holin family (TC# 1.E.31) and the 2/3 Holin family (TC# 1.E.33). These three families share the characteristics that they consist of members that are of about the same sizes and have 2 transmembrane segments (TMSs). There is however an exception; subfamily 6 (TC# 1.E.36.6) includes proteins displaying 4 putative TMSs.

== See also ==
- Holin
- Lysin
- Transporter Classification Database
