= P68 holin family =

Family of transport proteins

The Staphylococcus phage P68 Putative Holin (P68 Hol) Family (TC# 1.E.38) consists of a single putative holin (TC# 1.E.38.1.1) from Staphylococcus aureus phage P68 that is 92 amino acyl residues (aas) in length and exhibits 2 transmembrane segments (TMSs). While annotated as a holin, this protein has not been functionally characterized.^{[2]}

== See also ==
- Holin
- Lysin
- Transporter Classification Database
