= LLHol family =

Class of transmembrane transport proteins

The Putative Lactococcus lactis Holin (LLHol) Family (TC# 1.E.44) consists of just a few proteins from Lactococcus lactis species and their phage. These proteins are small, between 61 and 78 amino acyl residues (aas) in length, and exhibit one or two transmembrane segments (TMSs). As of March 2016, LLHol proteins remain functionally uncharacterized. They are not demonstrably homologous to members of other holin families and thus do not belong to one of the seven holin superfamilies. A representative list of proteins belonging to the LLHol family can be found in the Transporter Classification Database.

== See also ==
- Holin
- Lysin
- Transporter Classification Database
