= Vibrio holin family =

Family of transport proteins

The Vibrio Holin Family (TC# 1.E.30) consists of small proteins 50 to 65 amino acyl residues in length that exhibit a single N-terminal transmembrane domain. A representative list of proteins belonging to the Vibrio Holin family can be found in the Transporter Classification Database.

== See also ==
- Holin
- Lysin
- Transporter Classification Database
