= Dp-1 holin family =

Class of transmembrane transport proteins

The Bacterophase Dp-1 Holin (Dp-1 Holin) Family (TC# 1.E.24) is a family of proteins present in several Gram-positive bacteria (i.e., Enterococcus faecalis) and their phage. The genes coding for the lytic system of the pneumococcal phage, Dp-1, has been cloned and characterized. The holin of phage Dp-1 is 74 amino acyl residues (aas) long with two putative transmembrane segments (TMSs) (residues 12-32 and 39-57). The lytic enzyme of Dp-1 (Pal), an N-acetyl-muramoyl-L-alanine amidase, shows a modular organization similar to that described for the lytic enzymes of Streptococcus pneumoniae and its bacteriophage in which change in the order of the functional domains changes the enzyme specificity. A representative list of proteins belonging to the Dp-1 family can be found in the Transporter Classification Database.

== See also ==
- Holin
- Lysin
- Transporter Classification Database
