= Holin superfamily VI =

The Holin superfamily VI is a superfamily of integral membrane transport proteins. It is one of the seven different holin superfamilies in total. In general, these proteins are thought to play a role in regulated cell death, although functionality varies between families and individual members.

The Holin superfamily VI includes two TC families:

- 1.E.12 - The φAdh Holin (φAdh Holin) Family
- 1.E.26 - The Holin LLH (Holin LLH) Family

Superfamily VI includes families with members only from Bacillota. These proteins appear to have one N-terminal transmembrane segment (TMS), followed by an amphipathic, weakly hydrophobic peak that was not predicted to be transmembrane by the topological programs used by Reddy and Saier (2013). The average sizes of the members of the two families belonging to the Holin superfamily VI are 135 ± 11 and 130 ± 26 amino acyl residues (aas), respectively.

== See also ==
- Holin
- Lysin
- Transporter Classification Database
