= Caulobacter phage holin family =

Class of transmembrane transport proteins

The Caulobacter Phage Holin (CauHol) Family (TC# 1.E.47) consists of several putative holins of 157 to 159 amino acyl residues (aas) in length that exhibit 2 transmembrane segments (TMSs). They derive from phage specific for Caulobacter species. These proteins are not functionally characterized. A representative list of proteins belonging to the CauHol family can be found in the Transporter Classification Database.

== See also ==
- Holin
- Lysin
- Transporter Classification Database
