= EPPE-holin family =

Class of transmembrane transport proteins

The Erwinia Phage Phi-Ea1h Holin (EPPE-Hol) Family (TC# 1.E.58) consists of a single protein, holin of Erwinia Phage Phi-Ea1h (TC# 1.E.58.1.1), which is 119 amino acyl residues in length and exhibits a single transmembrane segment (TMS). Out of three open reading frames sequenced from bacteriophage Phi-Ea1h, the second ORF encodes this holin. Kim and Geider found that no signal sequence was observed at the N-terminus of the enzyme and suggested that the holin possibly facilities the export of an which may export a lysozyme and EPS depolymerase that carries out extracellular polysaccharide (EPS)-degrading activity.

== See also ==
- Holin
- Lysin
- Transporter Classification Database
