= Prophage Hp1 holin family =

Class of transmembrane transport proteins

The Prophage Hp1 Hol (Hp1Hol) Family (TC# 1.E.46) consists of a single putative holin (TC# 1.E.46.1.1) of 69 amino acyl residues in length, exhibiting what appears to be a single transmembrane segment (TMS). It is derived from the Bacillota, Clostridium hathewayi DSM 13479. This protein is functionally uncharacterized and does not appear to be homologous to other holins. It does, however, show 31% identity to a heavy metal transporter from Dethiosulfovibrio peptidovorans.

== See also ==
- Holin
- Lysin
- Transporter Classification Database
