= P35 =

P35 may refer to:

== Military ==
- Seversky P-35, an American fighter aircraft
- Browning Hi-Power, a pistol
- P-35 radar, a Soviet radar system
- Program 35, a satellite program of the United States Armed Forces
- P-35 Progress, a variant of the SS-N-3 Shaddock cruise missile

=== Vessels ===
- ARA Azopardo (P-35), a ship of the Argentine Navy
- HMS P.35 (1917), a P-class sloop of the Royal Navy
- HMS Umbra (P35), a submarine of the Royal Navy
- INS Akshay (P35), two ships of the Indian Navy

== Genes and proteins ==
- CDK5R1, an enzyme
- Early 35 kDa protein, a baculoviral protein
- IL12A, Interleukin-12 subunit alpha
- P35 holin family

== Other uses ==
- Beechcraft P35 Bonanza, an American general aviation aircraft
- Intel P35, a motherboard chipset
- Nissan P35, a cancelled car model
- Papyrus 35, a biblical manuscript
- Phosphorus-35, an isotope of phosphorus
