= A2 holin family =

The Putative Archaeal 2 TMS Holin (A2-Hol) Family (TC# 9.B.109) consists of a few putative holins from Nitrososphaerota ranging in size from about 130 to 165 amino acyl residues (aas) and exhibiting 2 transmembrane segments (TMSs). A representative list of proteins belonging to the A2-Hol family can be found in the Transporter Classification Database. The archaeon, Candidatus Nitrosoarchaeum limnia, encodes adjacent genes designated Toxin Secretion/Lysis Holin. The "toxin" gene encodes a soluble protein of 325 aas stated as belonging to the "Glycosyltransferase GBT-type Superfamily". This protein brings up other glycosyltransferases in a NCBI BLAST search. The adjacent gene encodes a small protein of 132 aas and 2 TMSs (TC# 9.B.109.1.1) that could be a holin, based on its size and topology. This protein has the UniProt accession number of S2E3C4. Paralogues are found in this same organism (Candidatus Nitrosoarchaeum koreensis) and other closely related species.

== See also ==
- Holin
- Lysin
- Transporter Classification Database
