= Putative holin-2 family =

Family of bacteria

The Putative Holin-2 (PH-2) Family (TC# 9.B.154) is a large family with members from a wide variety of bacteria (i.e., Roseifoexus, Cupriavidus (Ralstonia), Opitutus, Bacteroides, Pirellula). As of early 2016, functional data is not available for members of the PH-2 family, but based on their size and topology, it is believed they act as holins to facilitate cell lysis. PH-2 family proteins are of 130 to 210 amino acyl residues (aas) in length and may exhibit 1 or 2 transmembrane segments (TMSs). A representative list of proteins belonging to the PH-2 family can be found in the Transporter Classification Database.

== See also ==
- Holin
- Lysin
- Transporter Classification Database
