= P35 holin family =

The PRD1 Phage P35 Holin (P35 Holin) Family (TC# 1.E.5) is a member of Holin Superfamily III. The prototype for this family is the lipid-containing PRD1 enterobacterial phage holin protein P35 (12.8 kDa; TC# 1.E.5.1.1) encoded by gene XXXV (orfT). It is a component of a typical holin-endolysin system which functions to lyse the host bacterial cell.

== Structure ==
P35 holin (TC# 1.E.5.1.1) has 3 transmembrane segments (TMSs) with 5 positively charged residues between TMSs 1 and 2. It has 4 positively charged residues at the C-terminus. It is therefore thought that the N-terminus is in the periplasm and the C-terminus is in the cytoplasm. Homologues of 109 amino acyl residues (aas), which also have 3 putative TMSs, are encoded in the genomes of Xylella fastidiosa strains.

== Function ==
The reaction catalyzed by P35 holin is:

autolysin (in) → autolysin (out)

== See also ==
- Bacteriophage
- Phage typing
- Holin
- Lysin
- Transporter Classification Database
