= Holin superfamily III =

The Holin Superfamily III is a superfamily of integral membrane transport proteins. It is one of the seven different holin superfamilies in total. In general, these proteins are thought to play a role in regulated cell death, although functionality varies between families and individual members.

Members of the holin superfamily III are derived from Pseudomonadota, Synergistota, Actinomycetota, Deinococcota, and Archaea. This superfamily includes seven TC families:

- 1.E.2 - The λ Holin S (λ Holin) Family
- 1.E.3 - The P2 Holin (P2 Holin) Family
- 1.E.4 - The LydA Holin (LydA Holin) Family
- 1.E.5 - The PRD1 Phage P35 Holin (P35 Holin) Family
- 1.E.20 - The Pseudomonas aeruginosa Hol Holin (Hol Holin) Family
- 1.E.34 - The Putative Actinobacterial Holin-X (Hol-X) Family
- 1.E.41 - The Deinococcus/Thermus Holin (D/T-Hol) Family

Members of all families (with the exception of the Hol-X family; TC# 1.E.34) appear to have three transmembrane segments (TMSs). Members of the Hol-X family appear to have two putative TMSs. The missing TMS in family 34 proteins is the N-terminal TMS as revealed by multiple alignments. These seven families have average sizes of 110, 96, 105, 112, 143, 159 and 108 amino acyl residues (aas), respectively. Notice that the only family with members predicted to have just two TMSs is the one containing the largest homologues; this is due to hydrophilic extensions. The average size of proteins in the entire superfamily is 114 aas with a standard deviation o 23 aas.

== See also ==
- Holin
- Lysin
- Transporter Classification Database
