= Targanta Therapeutics Corporation =

Targanta Therapeutics
- Type: Public (Nasdaq: TARG)
- Industry: Biotechnology
- Founded: 1997 (as PhageTech Inc.)
- Defunct: 2009
- Fate: Acquired
- Successor: The Medicines Company
- Headquarters: Cambridge, Massachusetts
- Number of employees: 82 9/24/07 per S-1
- Website: http://www.themedicinescompany.com/

Targanta Therapeutics Corporation was a biopharmaceutical company headquartered in Cambridge, Massachusetts. The company also had operations in Indianapolis, Montreal and Toronto. Targanta completed its initial public offering on October 9, 2007 and traded on the Nasdaq market under the symbol: TARG. Targanta was acquired by The Medicines Company in 2009.

== Development programs ==
Targanta's lead product candidate was oritavancin; a novel, semi-synthetic glycopeptide antibiotic being developed to treat serious Gram-positive infections in the hospital and other institutional settings. Oritavancin was originally discovered and developed by Eli Lilly; Targanta acquired worldwide rights to oritavancin from InterMune in late 2005. Data presented at the 47th Annual Interscience Conference on Antimicrobial Agents and Chemotherapy (ICAAC) in September 2007 demonstrated that oritavancin possesses potent and rapid bactericidal activity in vitro against a broad spectrum of both resistant and susceptible Gram-positive bacteria, including Staphylococcus aureus, methicillin-resistant Staphylococcus aureus, Enterococci, Clostridioides difficile and Streptococci. Results have been presented but not yet published from two pivotal Phase 3 clinical trials testing the efficacy of oritavancin for the treatment of Complicated skin and skin-structure infections (cSSSI) caused by Gram-positive bacteria. The primary endpoints of both studies were successfully met, with oritavancin achieving efficacy with fewer days of therapy than the comparator agents (vancomycin followed by cephalexin). In addition, oritavancin showed a significantly improved safety profile with a 19.2 percent relative reduction in the overall incidence of adverse events versus vancomycin/cephalexin (p<0.001) in the second and larger pivotal trial.

Targanta also developed a novel drug discovery platform to generate molecules that deliver antibiotics directly to the bone. Also at the 47th ICAAC meeting in September 2007, Targanta presented the first in vivo pre-clinical data on candidates from this program, demonstrating efficacy of its rifabutin-bisphosphonate prodrug (TT99000647) in a rabbit osteomyelitis model.
