= Treponema 4 TMS holin family =

Class of transmembrane transport proteins

The Putative Treponema 4 TMS Holin (Tre4Hol) Family (TC# 1.E.49) consists of several proteins from Treponema species. They range in size from 100 to 110 amino acyl residues (aas) in length and exhibit 4 transmembrane segments (TMSs). A fragment has been sequenced from Treponema phage Phi td1 (D2ECI8) and was designated a putative holin (41 aas and 1 TMS; TC# 1.E.49.1.4).

== See also ==
- Holin
- Lysin
- Transporter Classification Database
