= M1 hol family =

Class of transmembrane transport proteins

The Mycobacterial 1 TMS Phage Holin (M1 Hol) Family (TC# 1.E.35) was identified and recognized by Catalao et al. (2012). Members of this family are found in mycobacterial phage, exhibit a single transmembrane segment (TMSs), and are about 75 to 95 amino acyl residues in length. Although annotated as holins, members of this family are not yet functionally characterized. A representative list of proteins belonging to this family can be found in the Transporter Classification Database.

== See also ==
- Holin
- Lysin
- Transporter Classification Database
