= T7 holin family =

The T7 Holin family (TC# 1.E.6) is a member of the Holin Superfamily II. Members of this family are predominantly found in Caudovirales and Pseudomonadota. They typically have only 1 transmembrane segment (TMS) and vary from 60 to 130 amino acyl residues in length. A representative list of proteins belonging to this family can be found in the Transporter Classification Database.

== See also ==
- Holin
- Lysin
- Transporter Classification Database
