= Gp36 hol family =

Class of transmembrane transport proteins

The Mycobacterial Phage PBI1 Gp36 Holin (Gp36 Hol) Family (TC# 1.E.39) consists of a single protein, Gp36 of Mycobacterial phage PBI1 (TC# 1.E.39.1.1) identified by Castalao et al. (2012). Gp36 is 116 amino acyl residues (aas) in length and exhibits 2 transmembrane segments (TMSs). While annotated as a holin, this protein has not been functionally characterized.

== See also ==
- Holin
- Lysin
- Transporter Classification Database
