= T-A hol family =

Class of transmembrane transport proteins

The Putative 3-4 TMS Transglycosylase-associated Holin (T-A Hol) Family (TC# 1.E.43) is believed to be a group of holins that does not belong to one of the seven holin superfamilies. Homologues include thousands of diverse phage and bacterial proteins between 80 and 140 amino acyl residues (aas) in length that exhibit 3 to 4 transmembrane segments (TMSs). These proteins are holin-like in their size and topology and are designated 'Transglycosylase-associated', 'Putative holin', 'Phage-like transmembrane protein', 'YeaQ protein', etc. in the NCBI protein database. As of early 2016, they remain functionally uncharacterized. They derive from a wide range of bacterial and archaeal phyla including both Gram-negative and Gram-positive bacteria. These proteins are related to the RDD family (TC# 9.B.45) in the conserved domain database. A representative list of proteins belonging to the T-A Hol family can be found in the Transporter Classification Database.

== See also ==
- Holin
- Lysin
- Transporter Classification Database
