= Corbomycin =

Glycopeptide antibiotic

Corbomycin is a member of the glycopeptide family of antibiotics that are produced by soil bacteria.

== Mechanism of action ==
Corbomycin blocks autolysins by attaching to the peptidoglycan cell wall. As a result, the bacterium cannot divide, as division requires the wall to be broken down and remodeled. Ordinary glycopeptides instead block cell wall formation.

== Applications ==
It can block infections caused by the drug-resistant strain of Staphylococcus aureus that cause serious infections. As of 2020 it had not been approved by any regulatory body for human use.

== History ==
The antibiotic was discovered in 2020. Researchers found the substance while studying the biosynthetic genes of glycopeptides that lacked self-resistance mechanisms. Researcher Beth Culp worked with Yves Brun and his team to image the cells to identify the action site. Culp's later team found other antibiotics that employed the same method of action. Complestatin is an existing antibiotic that was shown to use the same mechanism of action.
