= Streptomyces candidus =

Scientific classification
- Domain: Bacteria
- Kingdom: Bacillati
- Phylum: Actinomycetota
- Class: Actinomycetia
- Order: Streptomycetales
- Family: Streptomycetaceae
- Genus: Streptomyces
- Species: S. candidus

Binomial name
- Streptomyces candidus (ex Krassilnikov 1941) Sveshnikova 1986

Type strain
- AS 4.1664, ATCC 19735, ATCC 19891, ATCC 23891, BCRC 13760, CBS 677.68, CCRC 13760, CGMCC 4.1664, DSM 40141, ETH 28543, ICMP 12538, IFO 12846, INA 5855/54, ISP 5141, JCM 4629, KCC S-0629, KCTC 9020, NBRC 12846, NCIMB 12827, NRRL ISP-5141, NRRL-ISP 5141, PSA 183, RIA 1131, VKM Ac-1091, VTT E-072673

Synonyms
- "Actinomyces candidus" Krassilnikov 1941

Species of bacterium

Streptomyces candidus is a bacterium species from the genus of Streptomyces which has been isolated from soil in Russia. Streptomyces candidus produces lemonomycin, enterocin, pyrazofurin and avoparcin.

== See also ==
- List of Streptomyces species
