= Avoparcin =

- α-Avoparcin (R=H) β-Avoparcin (R=Cl)

Identifiers
CAS Number	mix: 37332-99-3; (α): 73957-86-5; (β): 73957-87-6; (ε): 88899-52-9
3D model (JSmol)	(α) (α): Interactive image; (β) (β): Interactive image
ChEMBL	mix: ChEMBL2108224
ChemSpider	(α): 16736403 (α); (β): 16736404 (β)
ECHA InfoCard	100.048.588
E number	E715 (antibiotics)
KEGG	mix: D03016
PubChem CID	(α): 20055225; (β): 20055226; 101586590
UNII	mix: WJ13O9MNTI; (α): I4J49AU691; (β): W47D7146JL
- InChI: InChI=1S/C89H102ClN9O36/c1-31-67(106)47(91)26-58(124-31)130-52-28-53-46(90)20-38(52)21-49-80(116)98-65(86(122)123)45-24-41(103)25-51(105)60(45)44-19-37(11-18-50(44)104)63(82(118)94-49)96-84(120)64-39-22-54(78(55(23-39)129-53)135-89-79(74(113)71(110)57(30-101)132-89)133-59-27-48(92)68(107)32(2)125-59)127-42-16-9-36(10-17-42)77(134-88-76(115)73(112)70(109)56(29-100)131-88)66(85(121)95-62(83(119)97-64)35-5-12-40(102)13-6-35)99-81(117)61(93-4)34-7-14-43(15-8-34)128-87-75(114)72(111)69(108)33(3)126-87/h5-20,22-25,28,31-33,47-49,56-59,61-77,79,87-89,93,100-115H,21,26-27,29-30,91-92H2,1-4H3,(H,94,118)(H,95,121)(H,96,120)(H,97,119)(H,98,116)(H,99,117)(H,122,123)/t31-,32-,33-,47+,48+,49-,56-,57+,58-,59-,61-,62-,63+,64+,65+,66+,67-,68-,69-,70-,71+,72+,73+,74-,75+,76+,77+,79+,87-,88-,89-/m0/s1 Key: JWFVWARSGMYXRN-HTQQBIQNSA-N; (β) (β): InChI=1S/C89H101Cl2N9O36/c1-30-67(107)46(92)25-58(125-30)131-52-27-53-45(91)19-37(52)20-48-80(117)99-65(86(123)124)43-23-39(103)24-51(106)60(43)42-17-35(9-15-49(42)104)62(82(119)95-48)96-84(121)64-38-21-54(78(55(22-38)130-53)136-89-79(74(114)71(111)57(29-102)133-89)134-59-26-47(93)68(108)31(2)126-59)128-40-13-7-34(8-14-40)77(135-88-76(116)73(113)70(110)56(28-101)132-88)66(85(122)97-63(83(120)98-64)36-10-16-50(105)44(90)18-36)100-81(118)61(94-4)33-5-11-41(12-6-33)129-87-75(115)72(112)69(109)32(3)127-87/h5-19,21-24,27,30-32,46-48,56-59,61-77,79,87-89,94,101-116H,20,25-26,28-29,92-93H2,1-4H3,(H,95,119)(H,96,121)(H,97,122)(H,98,120)(H,99,117)(H,100,118)(H,123,124)/t30-,31-,32-,46+,47+,48-,56-,57+,58-,59-,61-,62+,63-,64+,65+,66+,67-,68-,69-,70-,71+,72+,73+,74-,75+,76+,77+,79+,87-,88-,89-/m0/s1 Key: CASDGWYZIKZSQE-ZUWMJMDKSA-N
- SMILES: (α) (α): CN[C@H](C(=O)N[C@@H]5[C@H](O[C@@H]1O[C@@H](CO)[C@H](O)[C@@H](O)[C@H]1O)c2ccc(cc2)Oc%13cc7cc(Oc4cc(O[C@H]3C[C@@H](N)[C@@H](O)[C@H](C)O3)c(cc4Cl)C[C@@H]%10NC(=O)[C@H](NC(=O)[C@@H]7NC(=O)[C@@H](NC5=O)c6ccc(O)cc6)c8ccc(O)c(c8)c9c(O)cc(O)cc9[C@@H](NC%10=O)C(=O)O)c%13O[C@@H]%12O[C@H](CO)[C@@H](O)[C@H](O)[C@H]%12O[C@H]%11C[C@@H](N)[C@@H](O)[C@H](C)O%11)c%15ccc(O[C@@H]%14O[C@@H](C)[C@H](O)[C@@H](O)[C@H]%14O)cc%15; (β) (β): CN[C@H](C(=O)N[C@@H]5[C@H](O[C@@H]1O[C@@H](CO)[C@H](O)[C@@H](O)[C@H]1O)c2ccc(cc2)Oc%13cc7cc(Oc4cc(O[C@H]3C[C@@H](N)[C@@H](O)[C@H](C)O3)c(cc4Cl)C[C@@H]%10NC(=O)[C@H](NC(=O)[C@@H]7NC(=O)[C@@H](NC5=O)c6ccc(O)c(Cl)c6)c8ccc(O)c(c8)c9c(O)cc(O)cc9[C@@H](NC%10=O)C(=O)O)c%13O[C@@H]%12O[C@H](CO)[C@@H](O)[C@H](O)[C@H]%12O[C@H]%11C[C@@H](N)[C@@H](O)[C@H](C)O%11)c%15ccc(O[C@@H]%14O[C@@H](C)[C@H](O)[C@@H](O)[C@H]%14O)cc%15

Properties
Chemical formula	C_{89}H_{102}ClN_{9}O_{36} (α); C_{89}H_{101}Cl_{2}N_{9}O_{36} (β)
Molar mass	1909.254 (α); 1943.699 (β)
- Except where otherwise noted, data are given for materials in their standard state (at 25 °C [77 °F], 100 kPa). Infobox references

Avoparcin is a glycopeptide antibiotic effective against Gram-positive bacteria. It has been used in agriculture as an additive to livestock feed to promote growth in chickens, pigs, and cattle. It was also used as an aid in the prevention of necrotic enteritis in poultry.

Avoparcin is a mixture of two closely related chemical compounds, known as α-avoparcin and β-avoparcin, which differ by the presence of an additional chlorine atom in β-avoparcin. Avoparcin also shares a chemical similarity with vancomycin. Because of this similarity, concern exists that widespread use of avoparcin in animals may lead to an increased prevalence of vancomycin-resistant strains of bacteria.

Avoparcin was once widely used in Australia and the European Union, but it is currently not permitted in either.

Streptomyces candidus was found to produce avoparcin.

== Legal status ==
Avoparcin is prohibited in the European Union, Australia, and the United States. It was first banned in Denmark in 1995 as a feed additive, for its contributions to vancomycin-resistant Enterococcus (VRE), and later banned in several other European countries. It was never approved for use in the United States.
