= T1 holin family =

Class of transmembrane transport proteins

The Phage T1 Holin (T1 Holin) Family (TC# 1.E.37) is represented in enterobacterial phages T1, RTP and F20, Klebsiella phage KP36, and Escherichia phage ADB-2. All of these possess a putative holin that share a high level of identity. Additionally, Gp9 of E. coli phage phiE49 is similar in sequence. These proteins are short, 55 to 71 amino acyl residues (aas) in length, and exhibit a single transmembrane segment (TMS). A representative list of proteins belonging to the T1 Holin family can be found in the Transporter Classification Database.

== See also ==
- Holin
- Lysin
- Transporter Classification Database
