= Gene transfer agent-release holin family =

Gene transfer agent-release holins (GTA-Hol, TC# 1.E.54) are holins which are believed to facilitate the lysis-dependent release of a gene transfer agent. Particularly the gene transfer agent of Rhodobacter capsulatus (RcGTA), which is known to be a bacteriophage-like genetic element that induces horizontal gene transfer. The promoter of the RcGTA gene was identified by Westbye et al. in 2013. A representative list of members belonging to the GTA-Hol family can be found in the Transporter Classification Database with homologues found in Pseudomonadota (formerly proteobacteria) and caudovirales.

== See also ==
- Gene transfer agent
- Lysin
