= Lemonomycin =

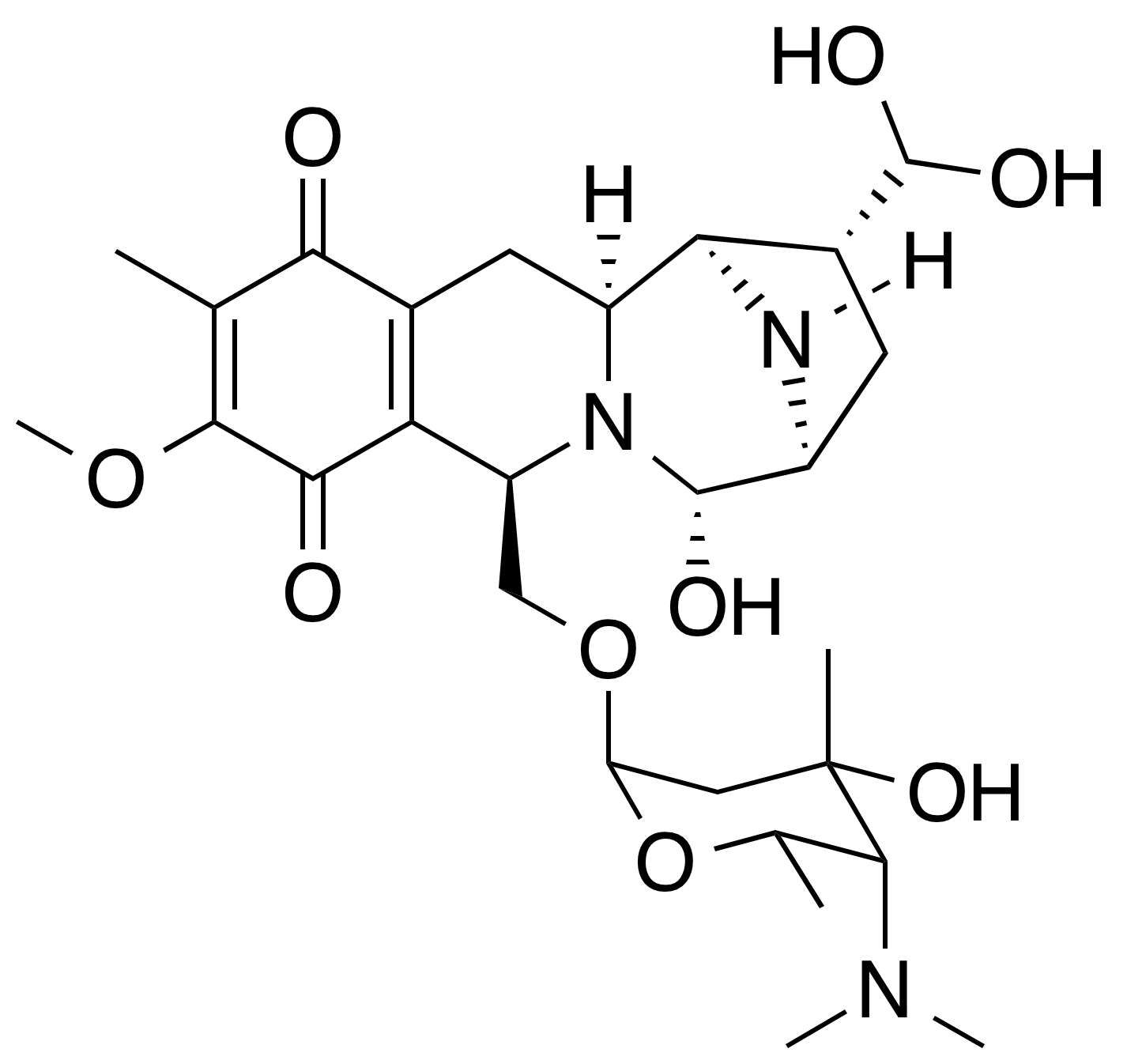

Names
- Other names (–)-Lemonomycin

Identifiers
3D model (JSmol)	Interactive image
ChEBI	CHEBI:211916
ChemSpider	8730105
PubChem CID	10554716
- InChI: InChI=1S/C27H41N3O9/c1-11-21(31)13-8-16-20-14(26(34)35)7-15(28-20)25(33)30(16)17(19(13)22(32)23(11)37-6)10-38-18-9-27(3,36)24(29(4)5)12(2)39-18/h12,14-18,20,24-26,28,33-36H,7-10H2,1-6H3/t12-,14+,15-,16-,17-,18+,20+,24+,25-,27-/m0/s1 Key: JXWCEWIDCYAQRW-RNWDBXQFSA-N
- SMILES: C[C@H]1[C@H]([C@@](C[C@@H](O1)OC[C@H]2C3=C(C[C@@H]4N2[C@H]([C@@H]5C[C@H]([C@H]4N5)C(O)O)O)C(=O)C(=C(C3=O)OC)C)(C)O)N(C)C

Properties
Chemical formula	C_{27}H_{41}N_{3}O_{9}
Molar mass	551.637 g·mol^{−1}
- Except where otherwise noted, data are given for materials in their standard state (at 25 °C [77 °F], 100 kPa). Infobox references

Lemonomycin is an antibiotic with the molecular formula C_{27}H_{41}N_{3}O_{9} which is produced by the bacterium Streptomyces candidus. Lemonomycin was first isolated in 1964 Lemonomycin has also shown activity against human colon tumor cells.
