= Holin superfamily I =

The Holin Superfamily I (aka the CDD phage holin1 superfamily) is a superfamily of integral membrane transport proteins. It is one of the seven different holin superfamilies in total. In general, these proteins are thought to play a role in regulated cell death, although functionality varies between families and individual members.

Its main constituent is the Phi11 Holin (φ11 Holin) Family. This family is made up of over 270 putative pore-forming proteins, all from Bacillota. On average, proteins belonging to the holin I superfamily are about 100 amino acyl residues (aas) in length, although a large size variation exists among proteins of this superfamily. There does not seem to be deviation from the standard two transmembrane segments that these proteins possess.

== See also ==
- Holins
- Lysin
- Transporter Classification Database
