= Enzybiotics =

Experimental antibacterial therapy

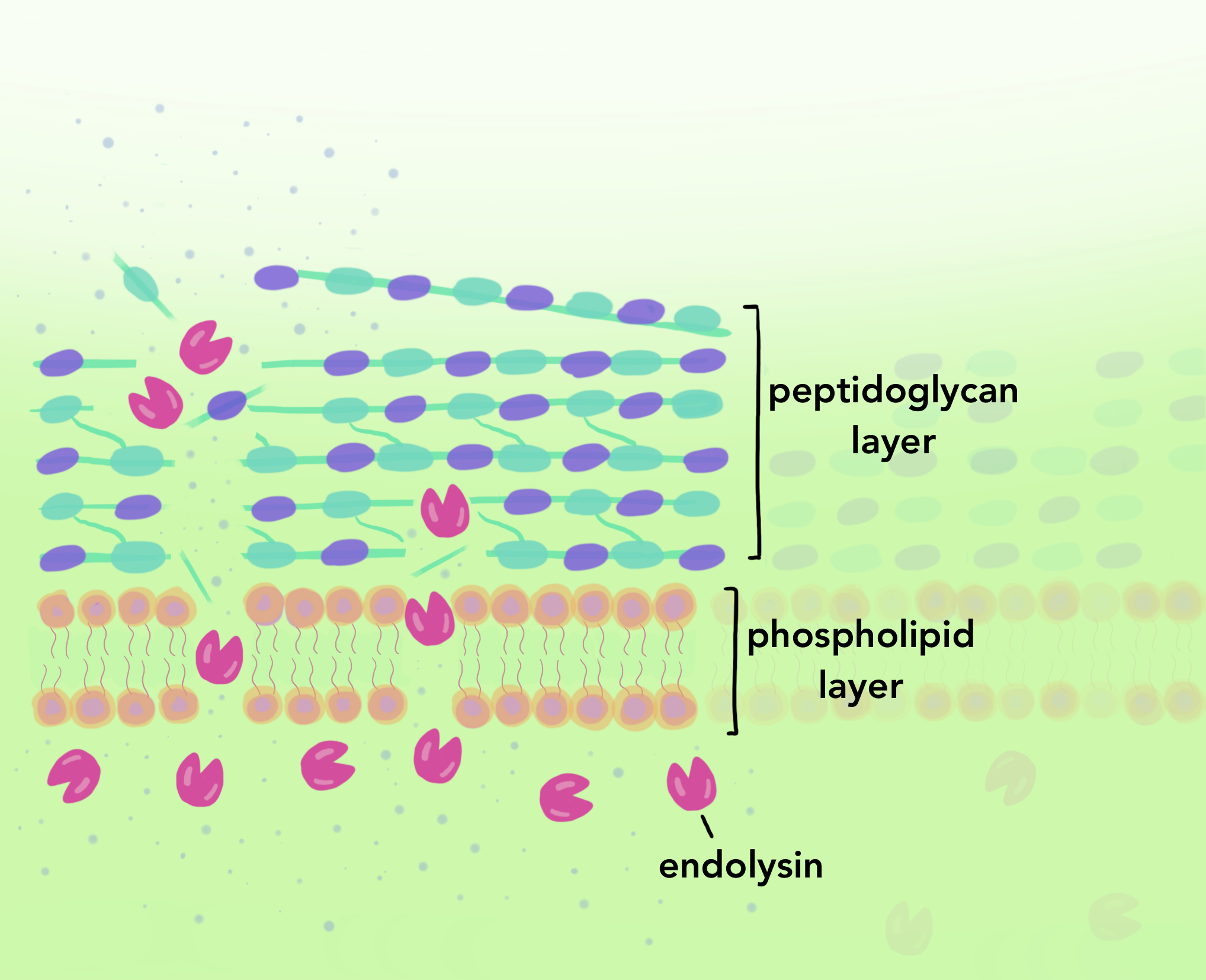
Simplistic schematic representation of endolysins cleaving the peptidoglycan layer of a Gram-positive bacterial cell wall. As endolysins degrade the peptidoglycan layer, the high internal pressure within the cell can no longer be maintained, resulting in cell lysis.

Enzybiotics are an experimental antibacterial therapy. The term is derived from a combination of the words “enzyme” and “antibiotics.” Enzymes have been extensively utilized for their antibacterial and antimicrobial properties. Proteolytic enzymes called endolysins have demonstrated particular effectiveness in combating a range of bacteria and are the basis for enzybiotic research. Endolysins are derived from bacteriophages and are highly efficient at lysing bacterial cells. Enzybiotics are being researched largely to address the issue of antibiotic resistance, which has allowed for the proliferation of drug-resistant pathogens posing great risk to animal and human health across the globe.

== Classification ==
=== Mechanism ===
Endolysins are specialized enzymes derived from bacteriophages, viruses that infect bacterial cells in order to replicate within them. Because phages have coevolved with their bacterial hosts, the endolysin system is very efficient at degrading bacterial cell walls. Phages release endolysins from inside bacterial host cells that cleave the peptidoglycan bonds of the bacterial cell wall. Once the cell is lysed, the bacteriophage is able to release progeny virions into the environment which in turn infect more bacterial cells. In addition to degrading bacterial cell walls from within, endolysins are effective when applied externally and can lyse Gram-positive bacteria that lack an outer cell membrane. Enzybiotics utilize endolysins to combat pathogens, exploiting their ability to home in on specific bacterial cells, their nontoxicity toward eukaryotic cells, and a decreased risk of pathogen resistance because they target highly conserved peptidoglycan bonds. A rapid killing rate of bacteria has also been observed upon administration of endolysins due to the enzymatic mechanism, as have synergistic effects among different endolysins and in combination with antibiotics, improving treatment outcomes of bacterial infections.

=== Research ===
In one of the earliest studies of endolysins as antibacterial therapy, oral streptococcus infections of mice were completely eradicated following bacteriophage endolysin treatment. Subsequent studies have demonstrated that endolysins of streptococcal phages ƛSA2 and B30, as well as endolysins LysK, CHAPK, and an engineered lysin LysKΔamidase all significantly reduced the activity of several Streptococcus species responsible for bovine mastitis, a widespread and costly concern in the dairy industry. Endolysins including LYSDERM-S, derived from Staphylococcus phage 812 (Kayvirus), were effective in destroying drug-resistant strains of Staphylococcus aureus, a pathogen causing chronic MRSA wound infections. Bacteriophage endolysins have been successful in preventing neonatal infections of penicillin-resistant Streptococcus agalactiae, a pathogen that is the leading cause of sepsis, meningitis, and pneumonia in newborns. Other studies have demonstrated the efficacy of endolysins in combating infection by various Bacillus, Enterococcus, and Streptococcus species, as well preventing biofilm formation of Escherichia coli and Listeria monocytogenes.

== History ==
=== Antibiotic resistance ===
As of July 2020, the World Health Organization considers antibiotic resistance “one of the biggest threats to global health, food security, and development today”. The processes by which pathogens become drug-resistant vary, but several types of antibiotic misuse, including self-medication and over-prescription of antibiotics in elderly communities have been implicated in the prevalence of drug-resistant Streptococcus pneumoniae (PRSP), Staphylococcus aureus (MRSA), and other Gram-negative bacilli. Once easily-treatable conditions like urinary tract infections have become increasingly difficult to address as infection-causing bacteria have developed resistance to multiple drugs. The growing number of antibiotic-resistant pathogens has prompted calls for research into innovative antimicrobial therapies.

== See also ==
- Phage therapy
