= BlyA holin family =

Class of transmembrane transport proteins

The BlyA Holin Family (TC# 1.E.17) is a group of holin proteins that are approximately 55-70 amino acyl residues (aas) in length and exhibit one transmembrane segment (TMS). A representative list of the proteins belonging to the BlyA holin family can be found in the Transporter Classification Database.

== BlyAB ==
The BlyA membrane protein and the BlyB soluble accessory protein are encoded on the conserved cp32 plasmid of Borrelia burgdorferi, which can be packaged into a bacteriophage particle. These two proteins had previously been proposed to comprise a hemolysis system, but Damman et al. (2000) provided evidence that BlyAB functions as a prophage-encoded holin system. BlyA promotes endolysin-dependent lysis of an induced lambda lysogen that is defective for the lambda holin S gene. The holin pores are generally stable and nonspecific, allowing endolysin access to the peptidoglycan.

Introduction of the Borrelia burgdorferi blyAB locus into Escherichia coli produces a hemolytic phenotype that is dependent on the E. coli clyA (hlyE, sheA) gene (TC# 1.C.10.1.1). Expression of blyA in E. coli causes damage to the E. coli cell envelope and a clyA-dependent hemolytic phenotype, regardless whether blyB is present or absent. The expression of blyB in E. coli, on the other hand, did not have obvious phenotypic effects. Transcriptional studies demonstrated that the clyA gene is not induced in E. coli cells expressing blyA. Furthermore, protein analyses suggested that the impairment of the E. coli cell envelope by BlyA is responsible for the emergence of the hemolytic activity as it allows latent intracellular ClyA protein, derived from basal-level expression of the clyA gene, to leak into the medium and to lyse erythrocytes. These findings are compatible with the presumption that BlyA functions as a membrane-active holin.

=== Transport Reaction ===
The physiologically relevant transport reaction believed to be catalyzed by BlyA is:

Endolysin (in) → Endolysin (out)
