= Lipoglycopeptide =

Class of chemical compounds

- Drug class
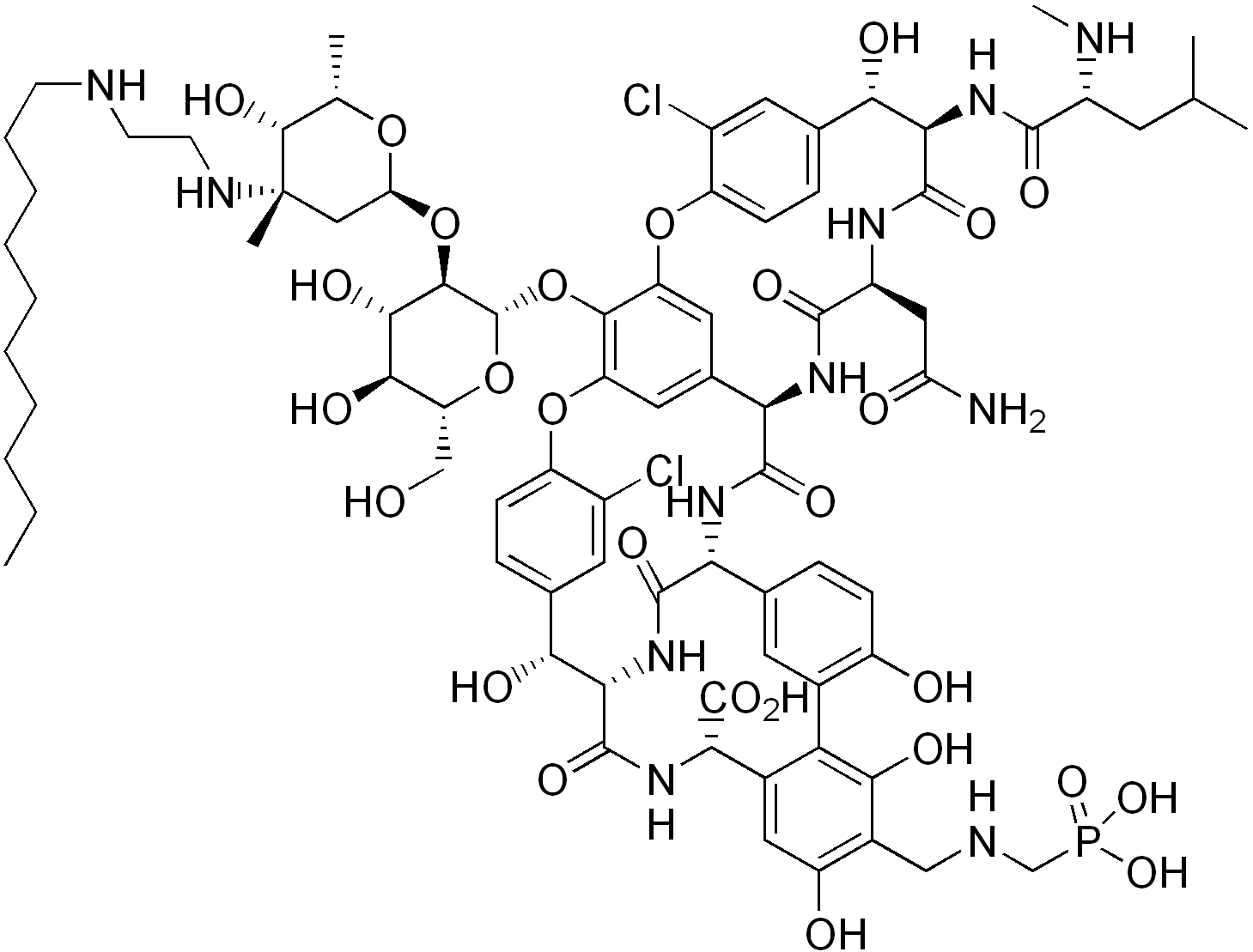
- Telavancin

Class identifiers
- Use: Antibiotic
- ATC code: J01XA
- Mode of action: Bacterial cell wall disruption
- Mechanism of action: Inhibit peptidoglycan glycosyltransferase chain elongation

Legal status

Lipoglycopeptides are a class of antibiotic that have lipophilic side-chains linked to glycopeptides. The class includes oritavancin, telavancin and dalbavancin.

In September 2009 the US Food and Drug Administration (FDA) approved telavancin (Vibativ) for complicated skin and skin structure infections (cSSSI) On May 23, 2014, the FDA approved dalbavancin (Dalvance), an injectable drug, administered intravenously in two doses one week apart. On August 6, 2014, the FDA approved oritavancin (Orbactiv), an injectable drug administered as a single dose to comprise a full course of therapy.

Telavancin is the most potent of the three against Clostridium spp.

== Approvals and clinical trials ==
Telavancin (once daily injection) has completed 4 phase III trials. and gained US FDA approval in September 2009 for complicated skin and skin structure infections (cSSSI).

Oritavancin (once daily injection) has completed phase II and phase III trials. Oritavancin was approved by the FDA on August 6, 2014, and by the EMA mid-2015, for treatment of acute bacterial skin and skin structure infections (ABSSSI).

Dalbavancin (once-weekly injection) was undergoing a phase II trial, due to end in 2003. The FDA approved dalbavancin for use to treat MRSA infections in adults on May 23, 2014. Dalbavancin is intended to treat acute bacterial skin and skin structure infections (ABSSSI) caused by certain susceptible bacteria like Staphylococcus aureus (including methicillin-susceptible and methicillin-resistant strains) and Streptococcus pyogenes. Dalbavancin is the first drug designated as a Qualified Infectious Disease Product (QIDP) to receive FDA approval. Under the Generating Antibiotic Incentives Now (GAIN) title of the FDA Safety and Innovation Act, dalbavancin was granted QIDP designation because it is an antibacterial or antifungal human drug intended to treat serious or life-threatening infections. As part of its QIDP designation, dalbavancin was given priority review, which provides an expedited review of the drug's application. dalbavancin's QIDP designation also qualifies it for an additional five years of marketing exclusivity to be added to certain exclusivity periods already provided by the Food, Drug and Cosmetic Act.

== See also ==
- Telavancin#Mechanism of action
