= INS Arnala =

INS Arnala (P68) may refer to the following vessels of the Indian Navy:

- INS Arnala (1972), an Arnala-class corvette commissioned in 1972 and decommissioned in 1999
- INS Arnala (2022), commissioned in 2025 and in active service
