= Autolysin =

Class of enzymes

Autolysins are endogenous lytic enzymes that break down the peptidoglycan components of biological cells which enables the separation of daughter cells following cell division. They are involved in cell growth, cell wall metabolism, cell division and separation, as well as peptidoglycan turnover and have similar functions to lysozymes.

Autolysin is formed from the precursor gene, Atl. Amidases (EC 3.5.1.28), gametolysin (EC 3.4.24.38), and glucosaminidase are considered as types of autolysins.

== Function and mechanisms ==
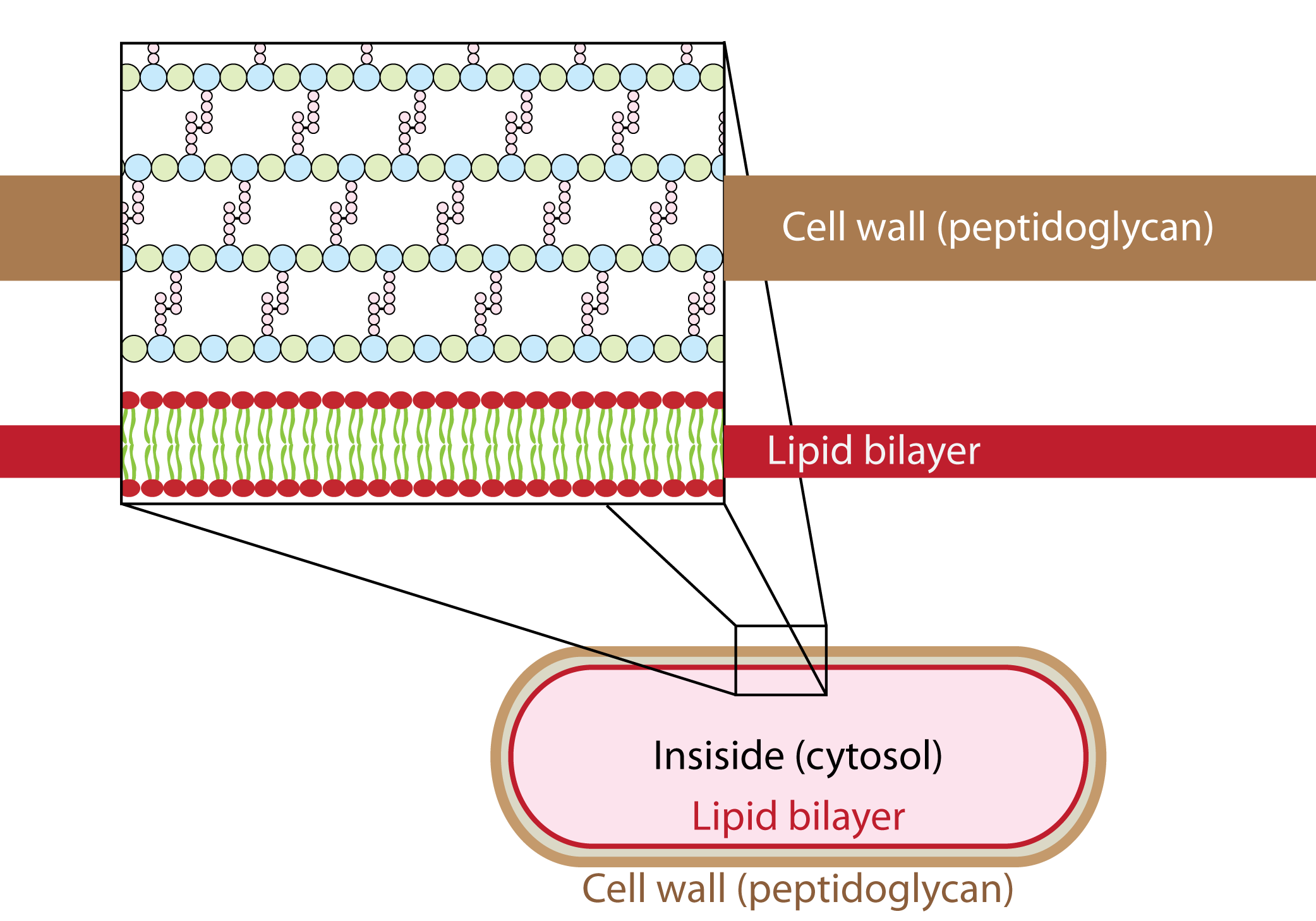
Peptidoglycan Cell Wall and their Cross Linked Peptides

Autolysins exist in all bacteria containing peptidoglycan and are potentially considered as lethal enzymes when uncontrolled. They target the glycosidic bonds as well as the cross-linked peptides of the peptidoglycan matrix. The peptidoglycan matrix functions for cell wall stability to protect from turgor changes and carries out function for immunological defense. These enzymes break down the peptidoglycan matrix in small sections to allow for peptidoglycan biosynthesis. Autolysins breaks down old peptidoglycan which allows for the formation of newer peptidoglycan for cell growth and elongation. This is called cell wall turnover. Autolysins do this by hydrolyzing the β-(1,4) glycosidic bond of the peptidoglycan cell wall and the linkage between N-acetylmuramoyl residues and L-amino acid residues of certain cell-wall glycopeptides. This enzyme catalyses the following chemical reaction:

Cleavage of the proline- and hydroxyproline-rich proteins of the Chlamydomonas cell wall; also cleaves azocasein, gelatin and Leu-Trp-Met-Arg-Phe-Ala

This glycoprotein is present in Chlamydomonas reinhardtii gametes.

Gram-positive bacteria regulate autolysins with teichoic acid molecules attached to the tetrapeptide of the peptidoglycan matrix.

The antibiotics complestatin and corbomycin prevent autolysin from remodeling the cell wall by binding to peptidoglycan, therefore stopping bacterial growth. The amide linkages between stem peptide and lactyl moiety of muramoyl residue are cleaved by N-acetylmuramoyl-l-alanine amidases and partakes in cell separation and the dissociation of the cell septum. There are 5 types of autolysins that contribute to cell separation of daughter cells, LytC, LytD, LytE, and LytF.

In a study conducted with mice, those that were immunized with autolysin were able to survive longer than the infected mice. This study was able to support as evidence autolysin's contribution in virulence and potential for vaccine antigen.

=== Lysis of mother cell ===
N-acetylmuramoyl-L-alanine amidase

Identifiers
- EC no.: 3.5.1.28
- CAS no.: 9013-25-6

Databases
- BRENDA: enzyme data
- ExPASy: NiceZyme view
- KEGG: enzyme entry
- MetaCyc: metabolic pathway
- Rhea: reactions
- PDB structures: RCSB PDB PDBe PDBsum
- Gene Ontology: AmiGO / QuickGO
Search
- PMC: articles
- PubMed: articles
- NCBI: proteins

LytC and CwlC are two amidases from the LytC family that hydrolyze the peptidoglycan of the mother cell wall to allow for the release of the mature endospore. CwlC is directly found in the mother cell wall.

=== Motility ===
Expression of lytC, lytD, and lytF genes together leads to flagellar motility and is controlled by the activity of the chemotaxis sigma factor, σ^{D}. The activity of this sigma factor peaks at the start of the stationary phase.

=== Potential lethality ===
Autolysins are naturally produced by peptidoglycan containing bacteria, but excessive amounts will degrade the peptidoglycan matrix and cause the cell to burst due to osmotic pressure. Previous studies have found that the byproducts of autolysin during cell wall breakdown are highly immunogenic. When observed in the bacteria, Bacillus subtilis, there were potentially lethal amounts of autolysin found in the cell walls. In Streptococcus pneumoniae it was found that N-acetylmuramoyl-l-alanine amidase, a cell wall autolysin, could assist in pathogenesis due to its ability to break down the wall or lyse a portion of the invading pneumococci and release potentially lethal toxins into the cell. Researchers studied the function, structure, and cloning ability through Escherichia coli and also determined its nucleotide sequence.

== Families ==
=== LytC amidase family ===
==== LytC ====
LytC as well as LytD are considered as two major autolysins that contribute to vegetative cell wall growth and account for 95% of the autolytic activity in B. subtilis. LytC is found in the cell wall. LytB, a non-autolysin, was found to enhance LytC activity. LytC and LytA interact and function together for lysis and cell death.

Gametolysin

Identifiers
- EC no.: 3.4.24.38
- CAS no.: 97089-74-2

Databases
- BRENDA: enzyme data
- ExPASy: NiceZyme view
- KEGG: enzyme entry
- MetaCyc: metabolic pathway
- Rhea: reactions
- PDB structures: RCSB PDB PDBe PDBsum
Search
- PMC: articles
- PubMed: articles
- NCBI: proteins

==== CwlC ====
CwlC is found in the mother cell wall and functions for the lysis of the mother cell wall. CwlC does not have a signal sequence but participates in late sporulation and is present in the cell wall. It was found in B. subtilis that CwlC is able to hydrolyze both vegetative cell walls and spore peptidoglycan.

=== LytD glucosaminidase family ===
This family of autolysin consist of only LytD itself. LytD functions for vegetative growth. Autolytic activity is found within the C-terminal region with catalytic domain homologous to the glucosaminidase domain. LytD is found in the cell wall. LytD activity was studied in B. subtilis and glucosaminidase activity was found in mature glycan strands due to the presence of MurNAc at the nonreducing ends.

== See also ==
- N-acetylmuramoyl-l-alanine amidase
- Enzyme
