= Holin =

Diverse group of small proteins

Holins are a diverse group of small proteins produced by dsDNA bacteriophages in order to trigger and control the degradation of the host's cell wall at the end of the lytic cycle. Holins form pores in the host's cell membrane, allowing lysins to reach and degrade peptidoglycan, a component of bacterial cell walls. Holins have been shown to regulate the timing of lysis with great precision. Over 50 unrelated gene families encode holins, making them the most diverse group of proteins with common function. Together with lysins, holins are being studied for their potential use as antibacterial agents.

While canonical holins act by forming large pores, pinholins such as the S protein of lambdoid phage 21 act by forming heptameric channels that depolarize the bacterial membrane. They are associated with SAR endolysins, which remain inactive in the periplasm prior to the depolarization of the membrane.

Viruses that infect eukaryotic cells may use similar channel-forming proteins called viroporins.

== Classification ==
=== Structure ===
According to their structure there are three main classes of holins.

==== Class I holins ====
Class I holins have three transmembrane domains (TMDs) with the N-terminus in the periplasm and the C-terminus in the cytoplasm. They generally have over 95 residues. Examples of class I holins include the bacteriophage λ S protein (λ holin) and the Staphylococcus aureus phage P68 hol15 protein.

==== Class II holins ====
Class II holins have two TMDs, with both the N- and the C-terminus in the cytoplasm. Their number of residues usually falls between 65 and 95. Examples include the S protein from lambdoid phage 21 and the Hol3626 protein from Clostridium perfringens bacteriophage Ф3626.

==== Class III holins ====
Unlike class I and class II holins, which are composed of hydrophobic transmembrane helices, class III holins form a single highly hydrophilic TMD, with the N-terminus in the cytoplasm and the C-terminus in the periplasm. The first class III holin to be characterized was the bacteriophage T4-encoded t protein (T4 holin). Other examples include the holins of the ФCP39O and ФCP26F phage.

=== Gene families ===
According to the Transporter Classification Database, there are a total of seven holin superfamilies.

- Holin superfamily I
- Holin superfamily II
- Holin superfamily III
- Holin superfamily IV
- Holin superfamily V
- Holin superfamily VI
- Holin superfamily VII

There are also several holin families that do not fall into the superfamilies designated above. These families include:

- 1.E.8 - The T4 Holin (T4 Holin) Family
- 1.E.13 - The Firmicute phage φU53 Holin (φU53 Holin) Family
- 1.E.14 - The CidA/LrgA Holin (CidA/LrgA Holin) Family
- 1.E.15 - The ArpQ Holin (ArpQ Holin) Family
- 1.E.17 - The BlyA Holin (BlyA Holin) Family
- 1.E.18 - The Lactococcus lactis Phage r1t Holin (r1t Holin) Family
- 1.E.22 - The Neisserial Phage-associated Holin (NP-Holin) Family
- 1.E.23 - The Bacillus Spore Morphogenesis and Germination Holin (BSH) Family
- 1.E.24 - The Bacterophase Dp-1 Holin (Dp-1 Holin) Family
- 1.E.27 - The BhlA Holin (BhlA Holin) Family
- 1.E.28 - The Streptomyces aureofaciens Phage Mu1/6 Holin (Mu1/6 Holin) Family
- 1.E.30 - The Vibrio Holin (Vibrio Holin) Family
- 1.E.31 - The SPP1 Holin (SPP1 Holin) Family
- 1.E.32 - The Actinobacterial 1 TMS Holin (A-1 Holin) Family
- 1.E.33 - The 2 or 3 TMS Putative Holin (2/3 Holin) Family
- 1.E.35 - The Mycobacterial 1 TMS Phage Holin (M1 Hol) Family
- 1.E.37 - The Phage T1 Holin (T1 Holin) Family
- 1.E.38 - The Staphylococcus phage P68 Putative Holin (P68 Hol) Family
- 1.E.39 - The Mycobacterial Phage PBI1 Gp36 Holin (Gp36 Hol) Family
- 1.E.42 - The Putative Holin-like Toxin (Hol-Tox) Family
- 1.E.43 - Putative Transglycosylase-associated Holin (T-A Hol) Family
- 1.E.44 - The Putative Lactococcus lactis Holin (LLHol) Family
- 1.E.45 - The Xanthomonas Phage Holin (XanPHol) Family
- 1.E.46 - The Prophage Hp1 Holin (Hp1Hol) Family
- 1.E.47 - The Caulobacter Phage Holin (CauHol) Family
- 1.E.48 - The Enterobacterial Holin (EBHol) Family
- 1.E.49 - The Putative Treponema 4 TMS Holin (Tre4Hol) Family
- 1.E.51 - The Putative Listeria Phage Holin (LP-Hol) Family
- 1.E.52 - The Flp/Fap Pilin Putative Holin (FFPP-Hol) Family
- 1.E.54 - The Gene Transfer Agent-release Holin (GTA-Hol) Family
- 1.E.55 - The Brachyspira holin (B-Hol) Family
- 1.E.56 - The Putative 3 TMS Holin (3-Hol) Family
- 1.E.57 - The Actinobacterial Phage Holin (APH) Family
- 1.E.58 - The Erwinia Phage Phi-Ea1h Holin (EPPE-Hol) Family
- 1.E.59 - The Putative Acholeplasma Phage L2 Holin (L2 Holin) Family
- 9.B.109 - The Putative Archaeal 2 TMS Holin (A2-Hol) Family
- 9.B.154 - The Putative Holin-2 (PH-2) Family
- 9.B.185 - The Putative Bacterial Archaeal Holin (BAH) Family

== See also ==
- Lysin
- Lytic cycle
