= Lysin =

Class of enzymes

Lysozyme-like phage lysin
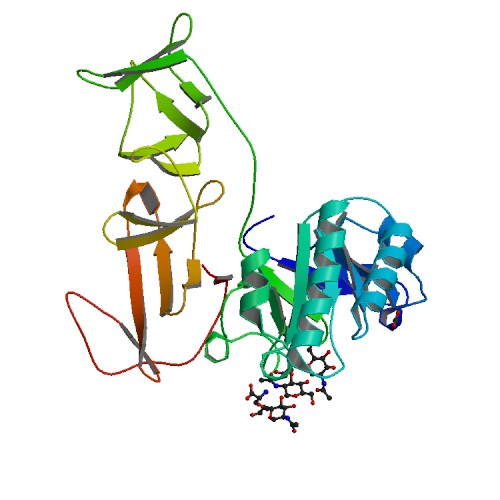
- Crystal structure of the modular CPL-1 endolysin from Streptococcus phage Cp-1 complexed with a peptidoglycan analogue. PDB entry 2j8g.

Identifiers
- EC no.: 3.2.1.17
- CAS no.: 9001-63-2

Databases
- IntEnz: IntEnz view
- BRENDA: BRENDA entry
- ExPASy: NiceZyme view
- KEGG: KEGG entry
- MetaCyc: metabolic pathway
- PRIAM: profile
- PDB structures: RCSB PDB PDBe PDBsum
- Gene Ontology: AmiGO / QuickGO
Search
- PMC: articles
- PubMed: articles
- NCBI: proteins

Lysins, also known as endolysins or murein hydrolases, are hydrolytic enzymes produced by host bacteria when infected with bacteriophages in order to cleave the cell wall during the final stage of the lytic cycle to release the viral particles. Lysins are highly evolved enzymes that are able to target one of the five bonds in peptidoglycan (murein), the main component of bacterial cell walls, which allows the release of progeny virions from the lysed cell. Cell-wall-containing Archaea are also lysed by specialized pseudomurein-cleaving lysins, while most archaeal viruses employ alternative mechanisms. Similarly, not all bacteriophages synthesize lysins: some small single-stranded DNA and RNA phages produce membrane proteins that activate the host's autolytic mechanisms such as autolysins.

Lysins were first used therapeutically in 2001 and are now being used as antibacterial agents due to their high effectiveness and specificity in comparison with antibiotics, which are susceptible to bacterial resistance. Because lysins are essential for bacteriophage survival, resistance to lysins is an extremely rare event. Over the course of lysin development as therapeutics, resistance has not been observed, even when resistance is forced by mutagenesis experiments.

== Structure ==
Double-stranded DNA phage lysins tend to lie within the 25 to 40 kDa range in terms of size. A notable exception is the streptococcal PlyC endolysin, which is 114 kDa. PlyC is not only the biggest and most potent lysin, but also structurally unique since it is composed of two different gene products, PlyCA and PlyCB, with a ratio of eight PlyCB subunits for each PlyCA in its active conformation.

All other lysins are monomeric and comprise two domains separated by a short linker region. For gram positive bacteria lysins, the N-terminal domain catalyses the hydrolysis of peptidoglycan whereas the C-terminal domain binds to the cell wall substrate.

=== Catalytic domain ===
The catalytic domain is responsible for the cleavage of peptidoglycan bonds. Functionally, five types of lysin catalytic domain can be distinguished:

- Endo-β-N-acetylglucosaminidase (Endoglycosidase H, EC 3.2.1.96)
- N-acetylmuramidase (lysozyme-like, EC 3.2.1.17)
- Endopeptidase
- N-acetylmuramoyl-L-alanine amidase (T7-like, EC 3.5.1.28)
- γ-D-glutaminyl-L-lysine endopeptidase (EC 3.4.14.13)

Peptidoglycan consists of cross-linked amino acids and sugars which form alternating amino sugars: N-acetylglucosamine (NAG) and N-acetylmuramic acid (NAM). Endo-β-N-acetylglucosaminidase lysins cleave NAGs while N-acetylmuramidase lysins (lysozyme-like lysins) cleave NAMs. Endopeptidase lysins cleave any of the peptide bonds between amino acids, whereas N-acetylmuramoyl-l-alanine amidase lysins (or simply amidase lysins) hydrolyze the amide bond between the sugar and the amino acid moieties. Finally, the recently discovered γ-d-glutaminyl-l-lysine endopeptidase lysins cleave the gamma bond between D-glutamine and L-lysine residues. As is the case for autolysins, early confusion around the cleavage specificity of these individual enzymes has led to some misattributions of the name "lysozyme" to proteins without this activity.

Usually, two or more different catalytic domains are linked to a single cell-binding domain. This is typical in many staphylococcal lysins as well as the streptococcal PlyC holoenzyme, which contains two catalytic domains. Catalytic domains are highly conserved in phage lysins of the same class.

=== Cell-binding domain ===
The cell-binding domain (CBD) binds to a specific substrate found in the host bacterium's cell wall, usually a carbohydrate. In contrast to the catalytic domain, the cell-binding domain is variable, which allows a great specificity and decreases bacterial resistance. Binding affinity to the cell wall substrate tends to be high, possibly so as to sequester onto cell wall fragments any free enzyme, which could compete with phage progeny from infecting adjacent host bacteria.

== Evolution ==
It has been proposed that the main mechanism of evolution in phage lysins is the exchange of modular units, a process by which different catalytic and cell-binding domains have been swapped between lysins, which would have resulted in new combinations of both bacterial binding and catalytic specificities.

== Mode of action ==
The lysin catalytic domain digests peptidoglycan locally at a high rate, which causes holes in the cell wall. Since the cross-linked peptidoglycan cell wall is the only mechanism that prevents the spontaneous burst of bacterial cells due to the high internal pressure (3 to 5 atmospheres), enzymatic digestion by lysins irreversibly causes hypotonic lysis. Theoretically, due to the catalytic properties of phage lysins, a single enzyme would be sufficient to kill the host bacterium by cleaving the necessary number of bonds, even though this has yet to be proven. The work by Loessner et al suggests that cleavage is typically achieved by the joint action of multiple lysin molecules at a local region of the host's cell wall. The high binding affinity to the cell wall substrate (close to that of IgG for its substrate) of each lysin appear to be reason why multiple molecules are required, since every lysin binds so tightly to the cell wall that it can't break enough bonds to cause lysis by itself.

In order to reach the cell wall, phage lysins have to cross the cell membrane. However, they generally lack a signal peptide that would allow them to do so. In order to solve such a problem, phage viruses synthesize another protein called holin which binds to the cell membrane and makes holes in it (hence its name), allowing lysins to reach the peptidoglycan matrix. The prototypical holin is the lambda phage S protein, which assists the lambda phage R protein (lysin). All holins embed themselves in the cell membrane and contain at least two transmembrane helical domains. The hole making process is thought to be achieved by holin oligomerization at a specific moment when progeny virions are set to be released.

== Efficacy ==
Phage lysins are generally species or subspecies specific, which means that they are only effective against bacteria from which they were produced. While some lysins only act upon the cell walls of several bacterial phylotypes, some broad-spectrum lysins have been found. Similarly, some thermostable lysins are known, which makes them easier to use in biotechnology. Regarding their use as antibacterial agents, lysins have been found effective mainly against Gram-positive bacteria, since Gram-negative bacteria possess an outer membrane that prevents extracellular lysin molecules from digesting peptidoglycan. However, lysins with activity against Gram-negative bacteria, such as OBPgp279, have garnered interest as potential therapeutics.

== Immune response ==
One of the most problematic aspects of the use of phage lysins as antimicrobial agents is the potential immunogenicity of these enzymes. Unlike most antibiotics, proteins are prone to antibody recognition and binding, which means that lysins could be ineffective when treating bacterial infections or even dangerous, potentially leading to a systemic immune response or a cytokine storm. Nonetheless, experimental data from immunologically rich rabbit serum showed that hyperimmune serum slows down but does not block the activity of pneumococcal lysin Cpl-1.

== Antimicrobial use ==
Phage lysins have been successfully tested in animal models to control pathogenic antibiotic-resistant bacteria found on mucous membranes and in blood. The main advantage of lysins compared to antibiotics is not only the low bacterial resistance but also the high specificity towards the target pathogen, and low activity towards the host's normal bacterial flora.

Lysins were first used therapeutically in animals in 2001, in a publication in which mice orally colonized with Streptococcus pyogenes were decolonized with a single dose of PlyC lysin delivered orally.

== See also ==
- Phage therapy
- Enzybiotics
- Lysozyme
- OBPgp279
- Lysibody
