= Muramyl dipeptide =

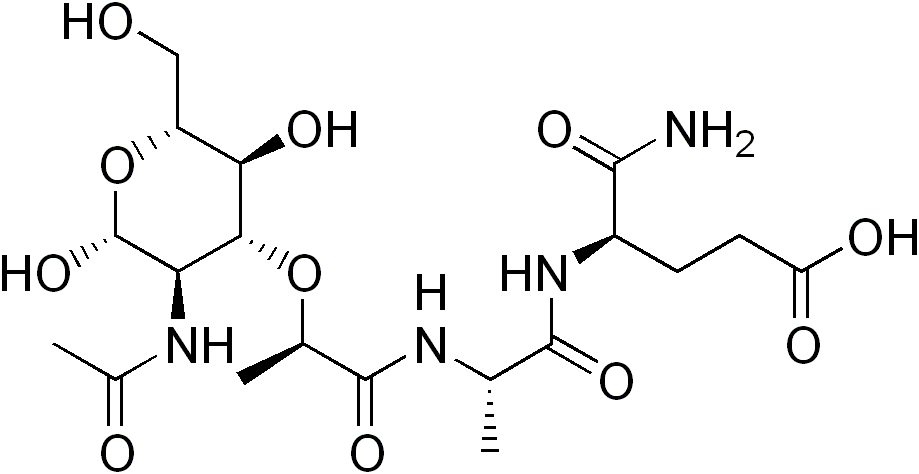

Names
- IUPAC name (4R)-4-[ [(2S)-2-[ [(2R)-2-[(2R,5S)-3-acetamido-2,5-dihydroxy-6-(hydroxymethyl)oxan-4-yl]oxypropanoyl]amino]propanoyl]amino]-5-amino-5-oxopentanoic acid
- Other names Acetylmuramyl-Alanyl-Isoglutamine

Identifiers
CAS Number	53678-77-6
3D model (JSmol)	Interactive image
ChemSpider	9794910
ECHA InfoCard	100.053.343
IUPHAR/BPS	5024
MeSH	Muramyl+dipeptide
PubChem CID	11620162
UNII	2U7S2HVO96
CompTox Dashboard (EPA)	DTXSID90897421
- InChI: InChI=1S/C19H32N4O11/c1-7(17(30)23-10(16(20)29)4-5-12(26)27)21-18(31)8(2)33-15-13(22-9(3)25)19(32)34-11(6-24)14(15)28/h7-8,10-11,13-15,19,24,28,32H,4-6H2,1-3H3,(H2,20,29)(H,21,31)(H,22,25)(H,23,30)(H,26,27)/t7-,8+,10+,11+,13+,14+,15+,19?/m0/s1 Key: BSOQXXWZTUDTEL-QAQREVAFSA-N; InChI=1/C19H32N4O11/c1-7(17(30)23-10(16(20)29)4-5-12(26)27)21-18(31)8(2)33-15-13(22-9(3)25)19(32)34-11(6-24)14(15)28/h7-8,10-11,13-15,19,24,28,32H,4-6H2,1-3H3,(H2,20,29)(H,21,31)(H,22,25)(H,23,30)(H,26,27)/t7-,8+,10+,11+,13+,14+,15+,19?/m0/s1 Key: BSOQXXWZTUDTEL-QAQREVAFBN
- SMILES: O=C(N)[C@H](NC(=O)[C@@H](NC(=O)[C@H](O[C@H]1[C@H](O)[C@H](OC(O)[C@@H]1NC(=O)C)CO)C)C)CCC(=O)O

Properties
Chemical formula	C_{19}H_{32}N_{4}O_{11}
Molar mass	492.47758
- Except where otherwise noted, data are given for materials in their standard state (at 25 °C [77 °F], 100 kPa). verify (what is ?) Infobox references

Muramyl dipeptide is a component of bacterial peptidoglycan, a recognition structure or activator for nucleotide-binding oligomerization domain 2 (NOD2) protein. It is a constituent of both Gram-positive and Gram-negative bacteria composed of N-acetylmuramic acid linked by its lactic acid moiety to the N-terminus of an L-alanine D-isoglutamine dipeptide. It can be recognized by the immune system as a pathogen-associated molecular pattern and activate the NALP3 inflammasome which, in turn, leads to cytokine activation, IL-1α and IL-1β especially.

Human NOD2 protein of the nucleotide-binding leucine-rich repeat family, is a cytoplasmic receptor involved in host innate immune system defense. Mutations in the CARD15 gene encoding NOD2 protein have been observed in Crohn's disease patients, decreasing the immune systems of these patients ability to recognize muramyl dipeptide. Analogues of muramyl dipeptide and their potential for immune response therapies in cancer and disease are being investigated. Experiments published in 2008 showed that muramyl dipeptide is involved in a molecular pathway in mice that conferred protection from colitis.

== Mechanism of action ==
While muramyl dipeptide is recognized as the key ligand for the intracellular receptor NOD2, its cellular detection relies on a multi-step enzymatic pathway. Research has established that human cells cannot directly sense raw MDP; instead, the cytosolic enzyme N-acetylglucosamine kinase (NAGK) must first phosphorylate the N-acetylmuramic acid moiety at its C6 position, producing 6-O-phospho-MDP. Without this NAGK-mediated phosphorylation event, downstream NOD2 self-oligomerization and NF-κB inflammatory signaling are not triggered.

== Biomedical applications ==
Due to its robust immunogenic property as a pathogen-associated molecular pattern, MDP and its derivatives are heavily explored as molecular adjuvants for vaccine delivery and cancer treatments. However, free MDP has a high clearance rate and poor membrane penetration when administrated directly, Modern approaches leverage biomaterials engineering to overcome these limitations. For instance, MDP-presenting polymersomes have been designed to act as synthetic "artificial nanobacteria," which systematically enhance immune uptake by dendritic cells and macrophages, reversing the immunosuppressive properties of the tumor microenvironment in melanoma models.

== See also ==
- Taxol
- Dipeptide
- Mifamurtide, a synthetic analogue for the treatment of osteosarcoma
