= C5H10N2O3 =

The chemical structure of the amino acid, Glutamine which is one of the 20 standard proteogenic amino acids (protein building blocks). The two carbonyl groups (C=O) showcase the two degrees of unsaturation.

The organic molecular formula C_{5}H_{10}N_{2}O_{3} (molar mass: ≈ 146.14 g/mol) may refer to:

- Dimethylol ethylene urea: used in textile finishing.
- Glutamine: a common, proteogenic α-amino acid.
- Isoglutamine, or α-glutamine: a structural isomer of glutamine where the amide group is situated on a α-carbon instead of a γ-carbon.
- β-Ureidoisobutyric acid: an intermediate in the catabolism of pyrimidines (thymine/uracil).
