= Robert Lawrence Randall =

American orthopedic oncologist

Robert Randall
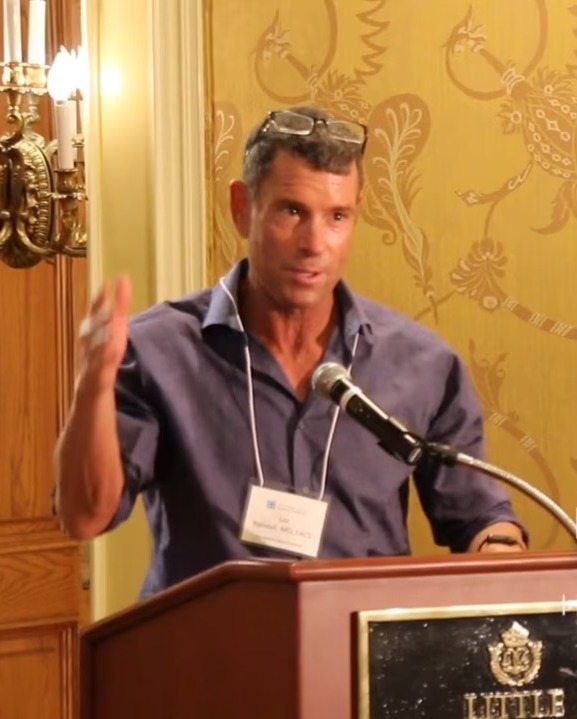
- Born: Washington, D.C.
- Education: Brown University; Yale University School of Medicine
- Scientific career
- Fields: Orthopaedic oncology

Robert Lawrence Randall is an American orthopaedic oncologist and academic, known for his work in treating bone and soft tissue sarcomas. He serves as the Chair of the Department of Orthopaedic Surgery at the University of California, Davis, and holds the David Linn Endowed Chair in Orthopaedic Surgery. Randall has advanced sarcoma research and treatment. His career spans roles at institutions such as the Yale School of Medicine, University of California, San Francisco (UCSF), University of Washington/Fred Hutchinson Cancer Center, University of Utah’s Huntsman Cancer Institute, Primary Children's Hospital, and Shriners Hospitals for Children.

He has been recognized among the top 1% of orthopaedic surgeons in the United States by US News & World Report. He is a Fellow of the American College of Surgeons (FACS) and the American Academy of Orthopaedic Surgeons (FAOA). He is an active member of organizations such as the Musculoskeletal Tumor Society and the Connective Tissue Oncology Society.

== Early life and education ==
Randall was born in Washington, D.C., United States, and pursued his undergraduate studies at Brown University, where he earned a Bachelor of Arts in human biology and molecular biology in 1988. He graduated magna cum laude, with honorary distinctions in biology, chemistry, and music. His senior honors research focused on the molecular genetic analysis of Schistosoma mansoni antigenicity.

He later attended Yale University School of Medicine, receiving his Doctorate of Medicine in 1992. Randall completed his internship in general surgery and residency in orthopaedic surgery at the University of California, San Francisco (UCSF), from 1992 to 1997. Following his residency, he completed a fellowship in musculoskeletal oncology at the Fred Hutchinson Cancer Center, University of Washington, in 1998.

== Career ==
Starting at the University of Utah in 1998 as an assistant professor, Randall became a full professor with tenure and the L.B. & Olive S. Young Presidential Endowed Chair for Cancer Research. He served as the Director of Sarcoma Services at the Huntsman Cancer Institute and Primary Children's Medical Center. He also developed and directed the Huntsman–Intermountain Adolescent and Young Adult (AYA) Cancer Care Program, the first combined healthcare program to span the two institutions.

Randall's clinical practice and research focus on musculoskeletal surgical oncology and building trans-disciplinary teams to combat rare cancers. His translational research includes work as chief of the Sarcoma Array Research Consortium (SARC) Lab and collaborations with Nobel Prize co-winner Mario Capecchi to develop genetically engineered mouse models.

In 2006, he created the Sarcoma Advanced Research and Clinical (SARC) Fellowship for training in academic sarcoma surgery. On November 7, 2012, Randall performed the world's first trans-dermal compressive osseointegration case for amputees.

== Research and contributions ==
Randall's research has focused on advancing the understanding and treatment of sarcomas. His work with the PARITY study group has established benchmarks for clinical research in orthopaedic oncology. He has authored over 300 peer-reviewed articles, including studies published in prestigious journals.

== Honors and awards ==
- National Merit Scholar (1982)
- President, Connective Tissue Oncology Society (2011)
- Sacramento Magazine Top Doctors Award (2019–2021)
- Best in California Magazine Top Oncologist (2023, 2024)

== Books ==
- Sarcoma Oncology: A Multidisciplinary Approach
- Metastatic Bone Disease: An Integrated Approach to Patient Care

== Journal publications ==
- Griffin KH, Thorpe SW, Sebastian A, Hum NR, Coonan TP, Sagheb IS, Loots GG, Randall RL, Leach JK. "Engineered bone marrow as a clinically relevant ex vivo model for primary bone cancer research and drug screening." Proc Natl Acad Sci U S A. 2023 Sep 26;120(39):e2302101120. doi:10.1073/pnas.2302101120. Epub 2023 Sep 20. PMID 37729195.
- Ilcisin L, Han R, Krailo M, Shulman DS, Weil BR, Weldon CB, Umaretiya P, Aziz-Bose R, Greenzang KA, Gorlick R, Reed DR, Randall RL, Nadel H, Binitie O, Dubois SG, Janeway KA, Bona K. "Poverty, race, ethnicity, and survival in pediatric nonmetastatic osteosarcoma: a Children's Oncology Group report." J Natl Cancer Inst. 2024 Oct 1;116(10):1664-1674. doi:10.1093/jnci/djae103. PMID 38926133.
- Walker K, Simister SK, Carr-Ascher J, Monument MJ, Thorpe SW, Randall RL. "Emerging innovations and advancements in the treatment of extremity and truncal soft tissue sarcomas." J Surg Oncol. 2024 Jan;129(1):97-111. doi:10.1002/jso.27526. Epub 2023 Nov 27. PMID 38010997.
- Zeitlinger L, Wilson M, Randall RL, Thorpe S; on behalf of the PARITY Investigators. "Surgical Duration Is Independently Associated with an Increased Risk of Surgical Site Infection and May Not Be Mitigated by Prolonged Antibiotics: A Secondary Analysis of the PARITY Trial of Infection After Lower-Extremity Endoprosthetic Reconstruction for Bone Tumors." Bone Joint Surg Am. 2023 Jul 19;105(Suppl 1):79-86. doi:10.2106/JBJS.23.00056. Epub 2023 Jul 19. PMID 37466584. Clinical Trial.
- Randall RL, Theriault RV, Thorpe SW, Monument MJ. "Emerging innovations and advancements in the field of musculoskeletal oncology." J Surg Oncol. 2023 Sep;128(3):415-417. doi:10.1002/jso.27409. PMID 37537986.
