= Mayilvahanan Natarajan =

Indian surgeon (born 1954)

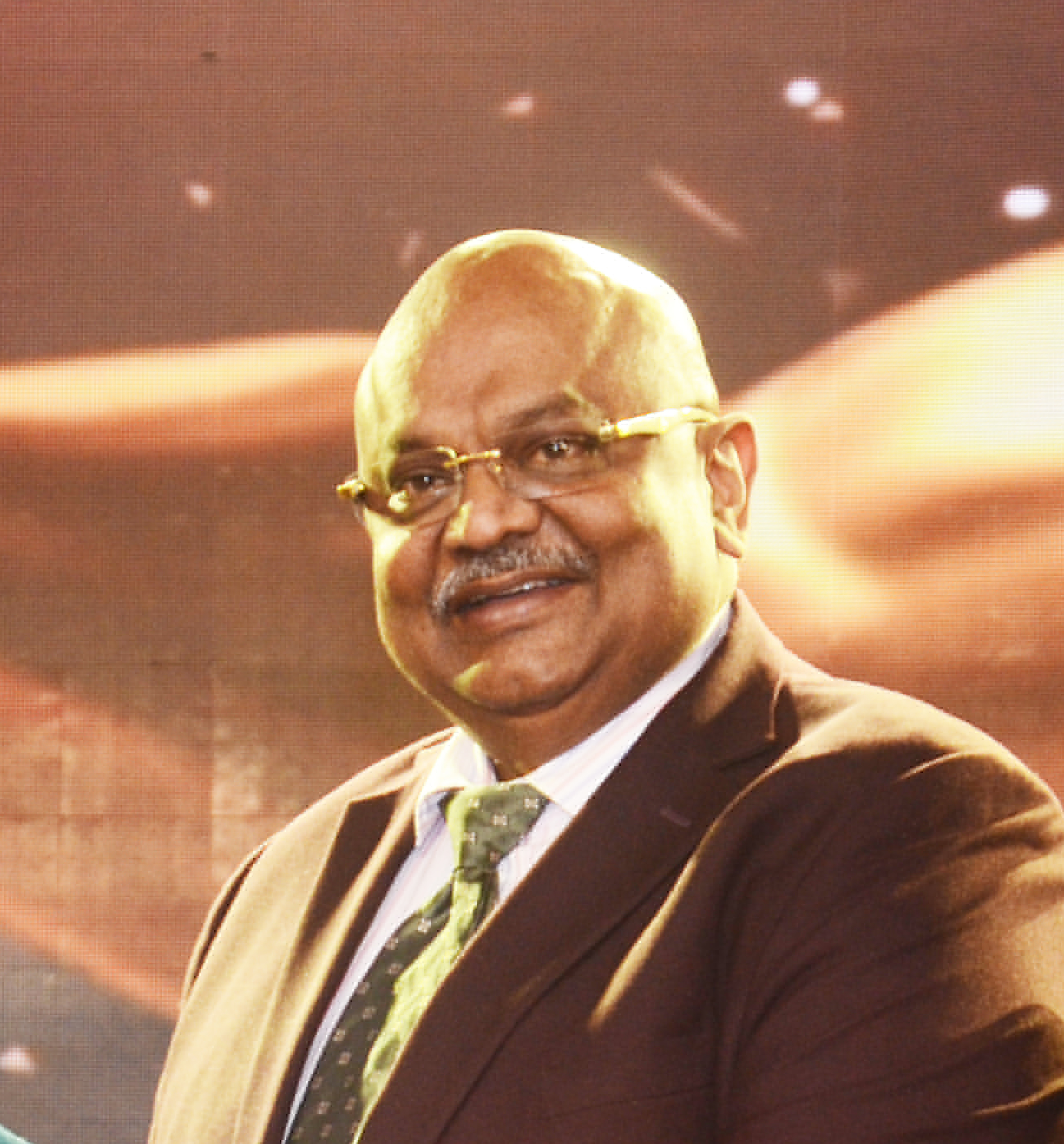
- Born: 24 December 1954 (age 71); Chennai
- Occupation: Orthopedic oncologist
- Spouse: Thenmozhi Natarajan
- Awards: Padma Shri; Dr. B. C. Roy Award

Dr. Mayilvahanan Natarajan (born 24 December 1954) is an Indian surgeon born in Chennai, erstwhile Madras in Tamilnadu state. Inspired by his father Dr. Mahalinga Moorthy Natarajan, an orthopedic surgeon who served as the professor of Dept. of Orthopedics, Madras Medical College for 19 years, he took orthopedic specialty for higher training after primary medical education. Dr. Natarajan has made substantial contributions to the specialties of Orthopedic oncology, Medical training, Health administration, Medical ethics and invention of Custom Mega Prostheses to avoid amputation for Bone tumor patients. For his efforts, he was awarded the Padma Shri by the government of India in 2007.

Mayilvahanan Natarajan, an elected fellow of the National Academy of Medical Sciences, was the 7th Vice Chancellor of Tamil Nadu Dr. M.G.R. Medical University. During his tenure as Vice-chancellor, he encouraged inter-disciplinary research and revamped the curriculum by adding post-graduate training program in the specialties of palliative care, and Diabetology.. He also brought in expertise from eminent scientists and physicians by collaborative research and conferring honorary professorship of the university. Natarajan`s major contribution to orthopedic specialty is the largest series of Custom Mega Prosthesis Surgeries for bone tumor. Totally 2,302 Custom Mega Prosthesis surgeries he has performed between 1988 to 2025, which was recognized by Asia book of records. He received the prestigious recognition of "Pharma Leaders Indian of the Year – Orthopedics” at Pharma Leaders Power Brand Awards 2018 founded by Satya Brahma.

Dr. Mayilvahanan Natarajan with Pharma Leaders Founder Satya Brahma, Dr. Satya Brahma, Dr. Sudhakar Shinde at PLS Power Brand Awards 2018

He was also awarded the Life Time Achievement Recognition for pioneering work in Bone Tumours by the Confederation of Indian Industry Tamilnadu Medclave (2022), and the Royal Society of Medicine has honored him in the virtual wall of honour.

Dr. Natarajan served as the president of Indian Orthopaedic Association(2006), Millennium President of Tamil Nadu Orthopaedic Association (2000) and President of Asia Pacific Musculo Skeletal Tumour Society (2000~2002).
