= Caetano Altafin =

Brazilian ocean rower

- Born: Caetano Penna Franco Altafin Rodrigues da Cunha; January 13, 1983 (age 43)
- Education: Harvard Law School
- Occupations: Entrepreneur; Attorney
- Known for: Rowing across the Atlantic Ocean

Caetano Penna Franco Altafin Rodrigues da Cunha (born January 13, 1983) is an attorney and ocean rower. In 2015, he rowed across the North Atlantic Ocean to promote osteosarcoma research. He has a Master of Law from Harvard Law School.

== Early life and education ==
Altafin was born in Rio de Janeiro, Brazil. He studied law at the Pontifical Catholic University of Rio de Janeiro (PUC-Rio) and participated in the Master of Laws (LL.M.) program at Harvard Law School in 2010.

While studying at Harvard, he was president of the Harvard Law School Brazilian Studies Association.

== Legal career ==
After graduating from Harvard Law School and being admitted to the New York Bar, Altafin worked at Simpson Thacher & Bartlett. He also worked at Hogan Lovells.

== Atlantic rowing ==
In 2015, Altafin participated in an 8-person transatlantic rowing voyage from Spain to Barbados, whose goal was to support osteosarcoma research at Brazil's National Institute of Traumatology and Orthopedics (INTO).

In 2016, he carried the Olympic torch during the Rio de Janeiro Olympic Games.

== Samba Soccer ==
In 2002, Altafin served as a coach with Samba Soccer in Ireland, participating in a youth football development programme. Contemporary newspaper coverage documented his participation in coaching clinics, school visits and community football events across several Irish counties, including Roscommon, Tipperary, Offaly and Waterford, alongside Brazilian and Argentine coaches.

During the same period, Altafin was received by President Mary McAleese at Áras an Uachtaráin as part of a delegation associated with the Samba Soccer programme.

== Research ==
Altafin has published academic work in the fields of corporate law and financial regulation, including articles in the Revista Semestral de Direito Empresarial. As an undergraduate researcher at the Pontifical Catholic University of Rio de Janeiro (PUC-Rio), Altafin authored the study A Arte de Ter Razão: Dialética e Erística em Aristóteles e Schopenhauer, developed through the university's PIBIC undergraduate research programme.

== Philanthropy ==
=== Crescendo Feliz / Library Tree (2002–2013) ===
In 2002, Altafin founded the Sociedade de Apoio à Inclusão Social Crescendo Feliz, also known as Library Tree, a non-profit organization dedicated to educational and social inclusion initiatives. He served as its chairperson and as a volunteer until December 2013. According to an interview published by Looplex, the organization established community libraries and developed sports activities for children with disabilities and from underserved communities.

=== TartarUrca ===
Altafin founded the TartarUrca Institute, a non-profit organization focused on environmental education and marine conservation in Guanabara Bay, Rio de Janeiro. The institute's activities include initiatives aimed at protecting marine species and promoting environmental awareness.

== Film ==
Altafin appeared in the documentary film Romance de Formação (2011), which followed students from universities in Brazil, the United States and Germany.
