= Glutamine (data page) =

Chemical data page

The complete data for Glutamine
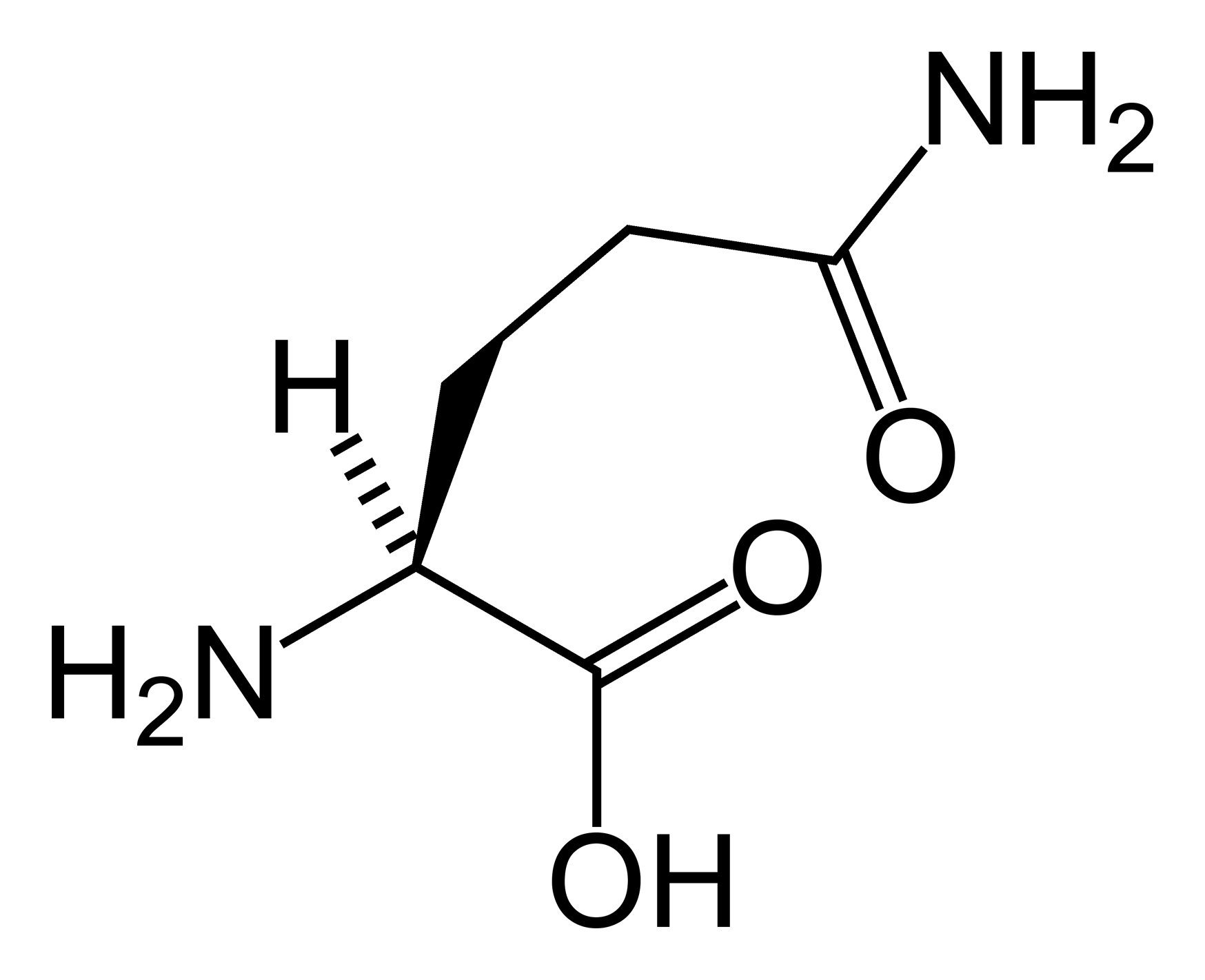
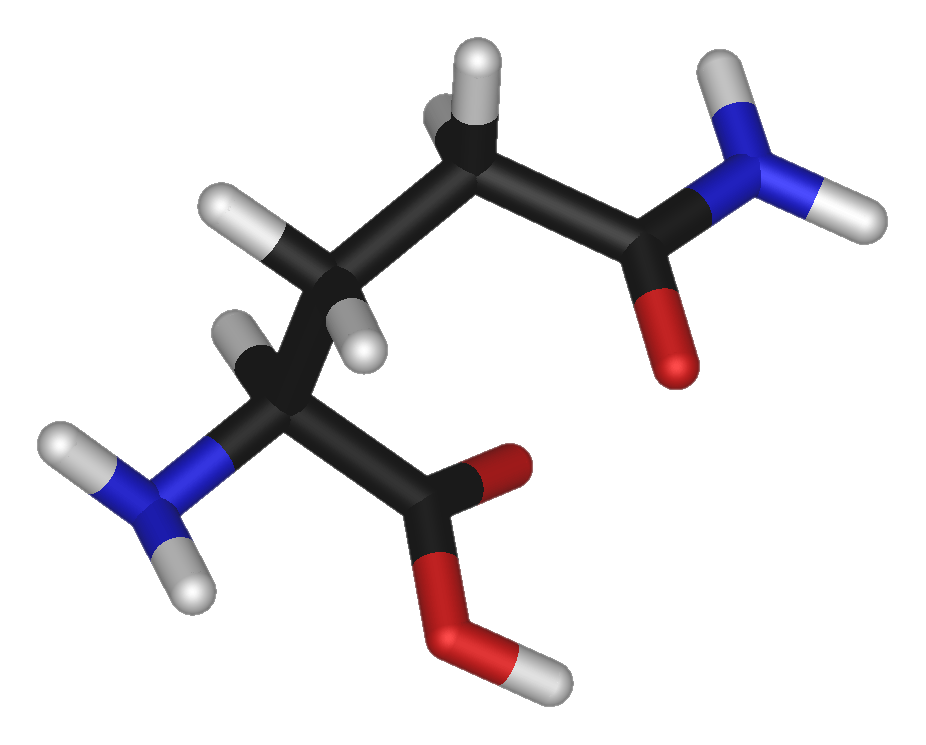
General information
Chemical formula: C_{5}H_{10}N_{2}O_{3}
Molar mass: 146.15 g·mol^{−1}
Systematic name:
(2S)-2-amino-4-carbamoyl-butanoic acid
Abbreviations: Q, Gln
Synonyms:
{γ/+/-/D/L}-Glutamine
2-amino-4-carbamoylbutanoic acid
{L-/D-}2-aminoglutaramic acid
AI3-32686
C00303
Cebrogen
G107
Glumin
Glutamic acid {5-/γ-} amide
{L-/D-}glutamid
Miglu-P
NSC 97925
NSC27421
Database data
SMILES: NC(=O)CCC(N)C(=O)O
InChI=1/C5H10N2O3/c6-3(5(9)10)1-2-4(7)8/h3H,1-2,6H2,(H2,7,8)(H,9,10)/f/h9H,7H2

ATC: N/A	CAS: [56-85-9]	DrugBank: N/A	EINECS: 200-292-1	PubChem: 738 ^{a}, 145815 (D)^{a}, 5961 (L)^{a}

Physical properties

Structure	Crystal data	Spectral data: UV-Vis / IR / NMR / MS: Masses of main fragments: GMD MS Spectrum

Phase behavior	Solid properties	Liquid properties	Gas properties

Hazard properties

MSDS N/A	Main hazards: N/A	NFPA 704	Flash point: N/A	RTECS number: N/A

Chemical properties

XLogP: -4.102	pI: 5.65	pK_{a}: 2.17; 9.13	Tautomers: 2	Hydrogen bond: donor - 3; acceptor - 4

Pharmacological properties

This box:
- Except where noted otherwise, data relate to Standard temperature and pressure.
- Reliability of data general note.
