= Isoglutamine =

- (S/L)-Isoglutamine

- (R/D)-Isoglutamine

Names
- IUPAC name α-Glutamine
- Systematic IUPAC name 4,5-Diamino-5-oxopentanoic acid

Identifiers
CAS Number	DL: 328-48-3; (S/L): 636-65-7; (R/D): 19522-40-8
3D model (JSmol)	DL: Interactive image; (S/L): Interactive image; (R/D): Interactive image
Abbreviations	IsoGln
ChemSpider	DL: 144380
DrugBank	(S/L): DB03091
KEGG	DL: C16673
PubChem CID	DL: 164697; (S/L): 445883; (R/D): 5288447
UNII	DL: 00VZE9Y4WF; (S/L): WL74QNU57B; (R/D): IY2O406N69
CompTox Dashboard (EPA)	DL: DTXSID80901304; (R/D): DTXSID90415341
- InChI: InChI=1S/C5H10N2O3/c6-3(5(7)10)1-2-4(8)9/h3H,1-2,6H2,(H2,7,10)(H,8,9) Key: AEFLONBTGZFSGQ-UHFFFAOYSA-N; DL: InChI=1S/C5H10N2O3/c6-3(5(7)10)1-2-4(8)9/h3H,1-2,6H2,(H2,7,10)(H,8,9); InChI=1/C5H10N2O3/c6-3(5(7)10)1-2-4(8)9/h3H,1-2,6H2,(H2,7,10)(H,8,9) Key: AEFLONBTGZFSGQ-UHFFFAOYAS; (S/L): InChI=1S/C5H10N2O3/c6-3(5(7)10)1-2-4(8)9/h3H,1-2,6H2,(H2,7,10)(H,8,9)/t3-/m0/s1 Key: AEFLONBTGZFSGQ-VKHMYHEASA-N; (R/D): InChI=1S/C5H10N2O3/c6-3(5(7)10)1-2-4(8)9/h3H,1-2,6H2,(H2,7,10)(H,8,9)/t3-/m1/s1 Key: AEFLONBTGZFSGQ-GSVOUGTGSA-N
- SMILES: DL: O=C(N)C(N)CCC(=O)O; (S/L): C(CC(=O)O)[C@@H](C(=O)N)N; (R/D): C(CC(=O)O)[C@H](C(=O)N)N

Properties
Chemical formula	C_{5}H_{10}N_{2}O_{3}
Molar mass	146.146 g·mol^{−1}
- Except where otherwise noted, data are given for materials in their standard state (at 25 °C [77 °F], 100 kPa). verify (what is ?) Infobox references

Isoglutamine or α-glutamine is a gamma amino acid derived from glutamic acid by substituting the carboxyl group in position 1 with an amide group. This is in contrast to the proteinogenic amino acid glutamine, which is the 5-amide of glutamic acid.

Isoglutamine can form the C-terminus of a peptide chain, as in muramyl dipeptide (MDP), a constituent of bacterial cell walls. It can also occur inside a peptide chain, in which case the chain is continued at the carboxyl group and isoglutamine behaves as a γ-amino acid, as in mifamurtide, a synthetic derivative of MDP used to treat osteosarcoma.

== Stereochemistry ==
Substituting l-glutamic acid, the proteinogenic enantiomer, gives l-isoglutamine, which has S configuration. d-Isoglutamine, the derivative of the nonproteinogenic d-glutamic acid, has R configuration. The latter is the form occurring in muramyl dipeptide and mifamurtide.
