= Codman triangle =

New growth of bone following the raising of periosteum away from the bone

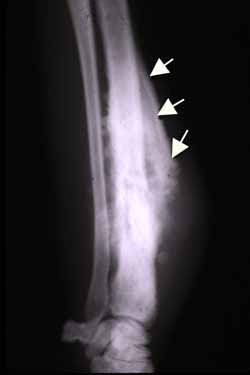
The Codman triangle

The Codman triangle (previously referred to as Codman's triangle) is the triangular area of new subperiosteal bone that is created when a lesion, often a tumor, raises the periosteum away from the bone. A Codman triangle is not actually a full triangle. Instead, it is often a pseudotriangle on radiographic findings, with ossification on the original bone and one additional side of the triangle, which forms a two sided triangle with one open side. This two sided appearance is generated due to a tumor (or growth) that is growing at a rate which is faster than the periosteum can grow or expand, so instead of dimpling, the periosteum tears away and provides ossification on the second edge of the triangle. The advancing tumour displaces the periosteum away from the bone medulla. The displaced and now lateral periosteum attempts to regenerate underlying bone. This describes a periosteal reaction.

The main causes for this sign are osteosarcoma, Ewing's sarcoma, eumycetoma, and a subperiosteal abscess.
