= Rotationplasty =

Type of autograft involving limb rotation

Rotationplasty, commonly known as a Van Nes rotation or Borggreve rotation, is a type of autograft wherein a portion of a limb is removed, while the remaining limb below the involved portion is rotated and reattached. This procedure is used when a portion of an extremity is injured, or affected by a disease such as cancer.

The procedure is most commonly used to transfer the ankle joint to the knee joint following removal of a distal femoral bone tumor, such as osteosarcoma. The limb is rotated because the ankle flexes in the opposite direction compared to the knee. The benefit to the patient is that they have a functioning knee joint to which a prosthetic can be fitted, providing them with better mobility.

== History ==
Rotationplasty was first performed by Joseph Borggreve in 1927. He performed the procedure on a 12-year-old boy who suffered from tuberculosis. However, the procedure was not well known until 1950, when Dutch orthopedist Cornelis Pieter van Nes (1897–1972) reported the results of rotationplasty procedures. He became well known for establishing the procedure. Since then, many surgeons have performed modified versions of rotationplasty and have had great success.

Originally, rotationplasty was performed to treat infections and tumors around the knee. It was also a common treatment for osteosarcoma. While it is still being used to treat their complications, rotationplasty is also used to treat growing children who have been diagnosed with tumors around the knee. Rotationplasty is also performed on children with congenital femoral deficiencies. Those deficiencies cause "unstable hip joint[s] and a femur that is 50% shorter than the contralateral, normal femur." This procedure gives rotationplasty patients the ability to have the use of both feet and allows them to continue living an active lifestyle.

== Procedure ==
In the actual procedure, the bone affected by the tumor, as well as a small part of the healthy femoral and occasionally tibia bone, is removed. A portion of the leg removed; the ankle joint is then turned 180 degrees and is reattached to the thigh. They are held together by plates and screws until they have healed naturally. The surgery can take anywhere from 6 to 10 hours, with a day or two in intensive care. The leg is kept in a cast for 6 to 12 weeks. After the leg has sufficiently healed, the leg can be fitted for a prosthetic.

== Advantages and disadvantages ==
=== Advantages ===
Rotationplasty allows the use of the knee joint, whereas amputation would result in loss of that joint. Therefore, it provides a better attachment point and range of motion for a prosthetic limb. As a result, children who have had rotationplasty can play sports, run, climb, and do more than would be possible with a jointless prosthetic. After the procedure, the leg is durable; patients do not typically have to undergo additional surgeries.

=== Disadvantages ===
Rotationplasty can result in poor circulation throughout the leg, infection, nerve injuries, bone healing complications, and fracture of the leg.

== Quality of life ==
A 2002 study measured life contentment and quality of life in 22 patients who had been recipients of the rotationplasty procedure at least 10 years before. They found that those patients that were younger when the procedure was performed were happier with their lives. It was also found that 8 of the 22 had to have a total of 21 surgical revisions performed in the 10 years. In comparison to the general population, the patients had a higher percentage of quality of life, 83% compared to 75%. Overall, the patients were more content with different aspects of their lives than the general population.
