= N-acetylglucosamine kinase =

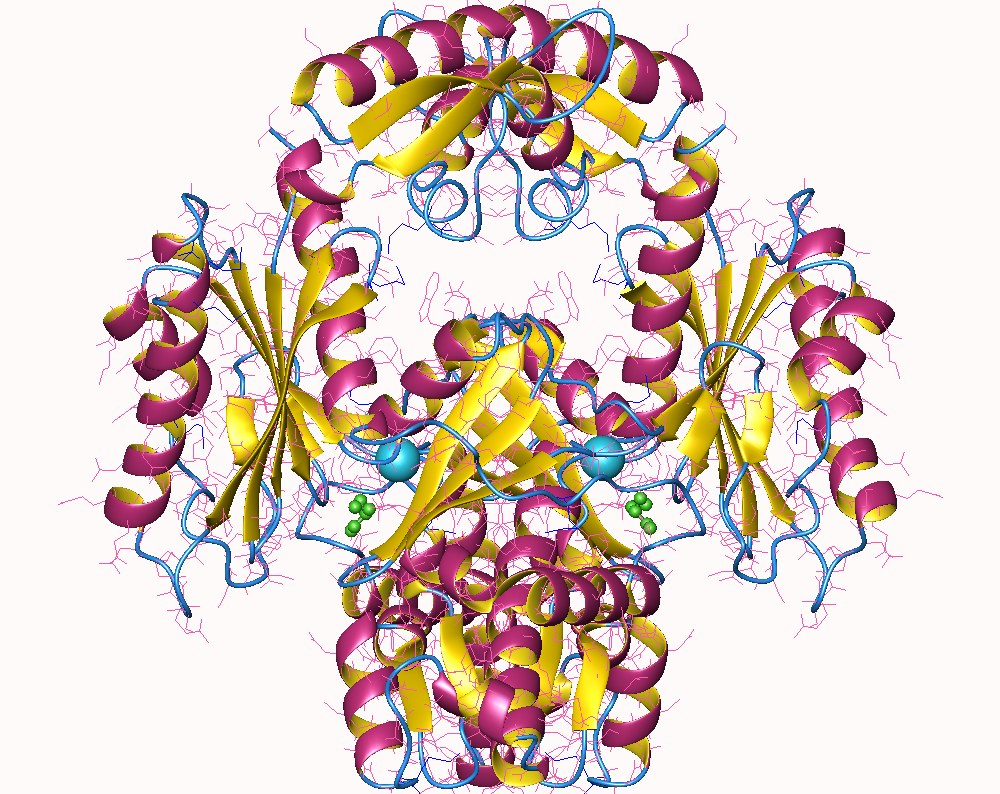
- N-acetylglucosamine kinase dimer, Thermotoga maritima

Identifiers
- EC no.: 2.7.1.59
- CAS no.: 9027-48-9

Databases
- BRENDA: enzyme data
- ExPASy: NiceZyme view
- KEGG: enzyme entry
- MetaCyc: metabolic pathway
- Rhea: reactions
- PDB structures: RCSB PDB PDBe PDBsum
- Gene Ontology: AmiGO / QuickGO
Search
- PMC: articles
- PubMed: articles
- NCBI: proteins

N-acetylglucosamine kinase (EC 2.7.1.59) is an enzyme that catalyzes the chemical reaction

ATP +
N-acetylglucosamine
ADP +
N-acetylglucosamine 6-phosphate

The enzyme characterised from the bacteria, Streptococcus pyogenes and Escherichia coli, converts N-acetylglucosamine to N-acetylglucosamine 6-phosphate by transferring a phosphate group from the cofactor, adenosine triphosphate (ATP), which is converted to adenosine diphosphate (ADP). The enzyme has also been found in hog spleen. Its structure in Thermotoga maritima has been determined.

This enzyme is a transferase, specifically one transferring phosphorus-containing groups (phosphotransferases) with an alcohol group as acceptor. The systematic name of this enzyme class is ATP:N-acetyl-D-glucosamine 6-phosphotransferase. Other names in common use include acetylglucosamine kinase (phosphorylating), ATP:2-acetylamino-2-deoxy-D-glucose 6-phosphotransferase, 2-acetylamino-2-deoxy-D-glucose kinase, and acetylaminodeoxyglucokinase.
