= Glutamine =

Amino acid

- Skeletal formula of L-glutamine

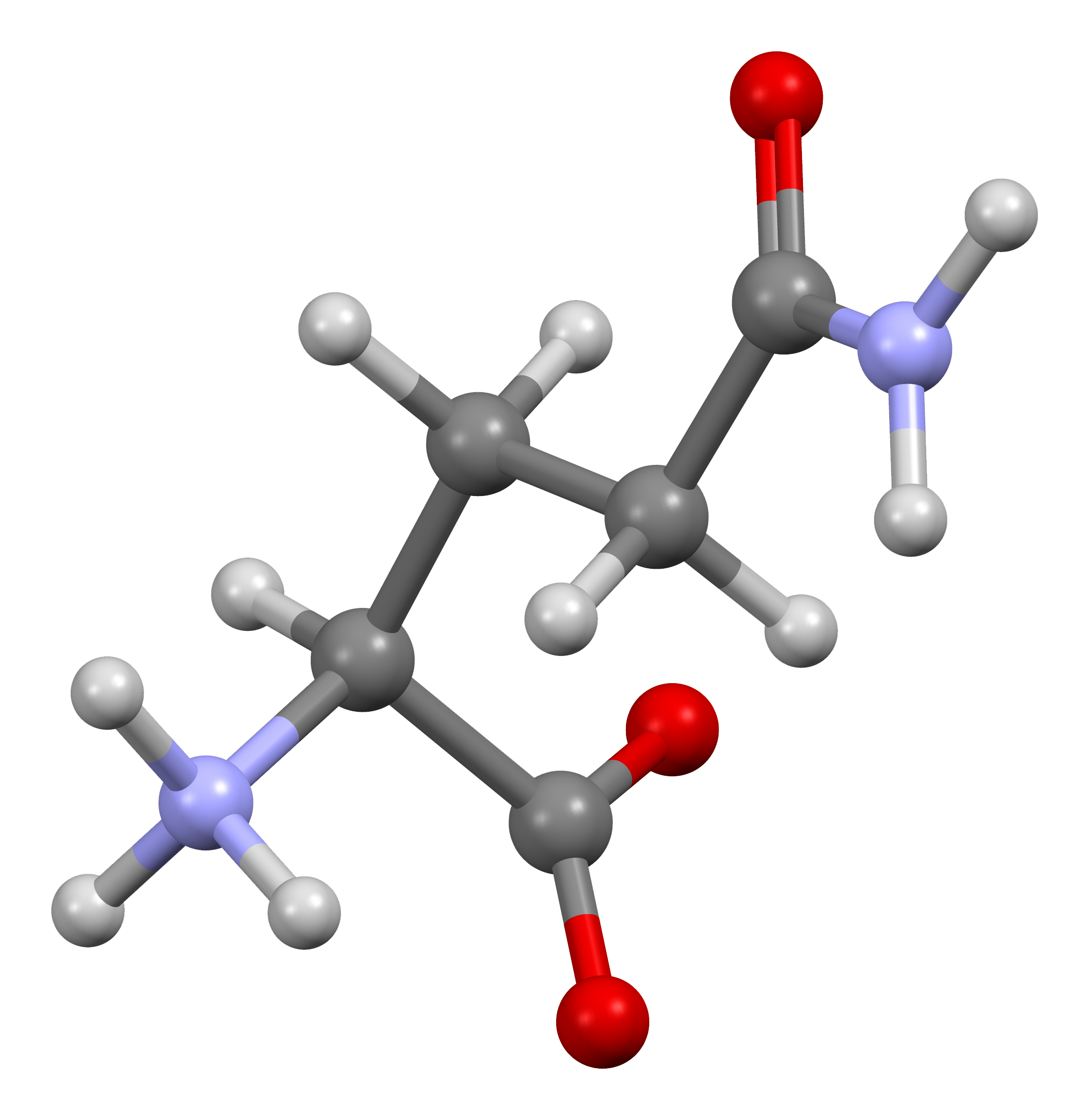
Ball-and-stick model
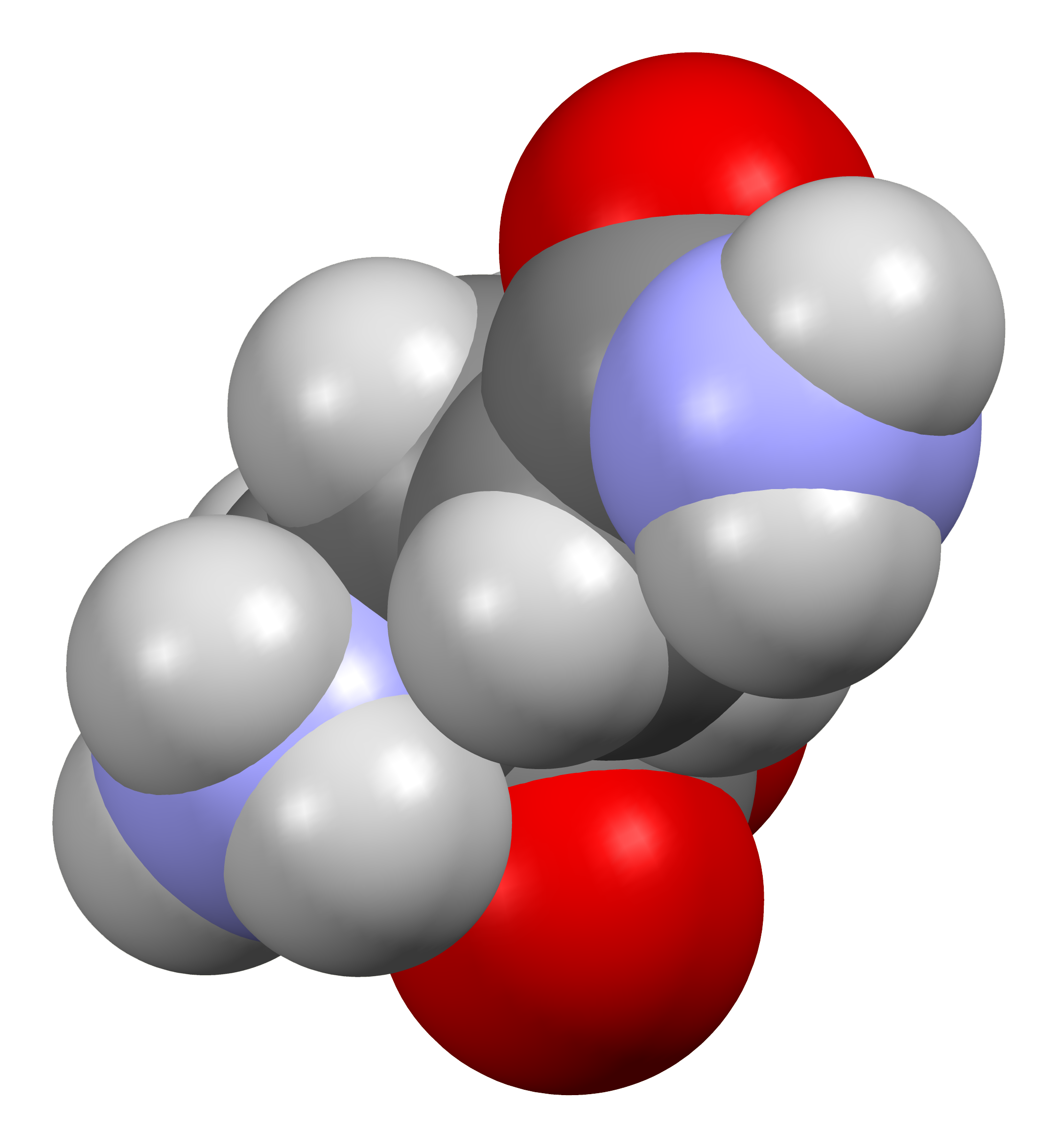
Space-filling model
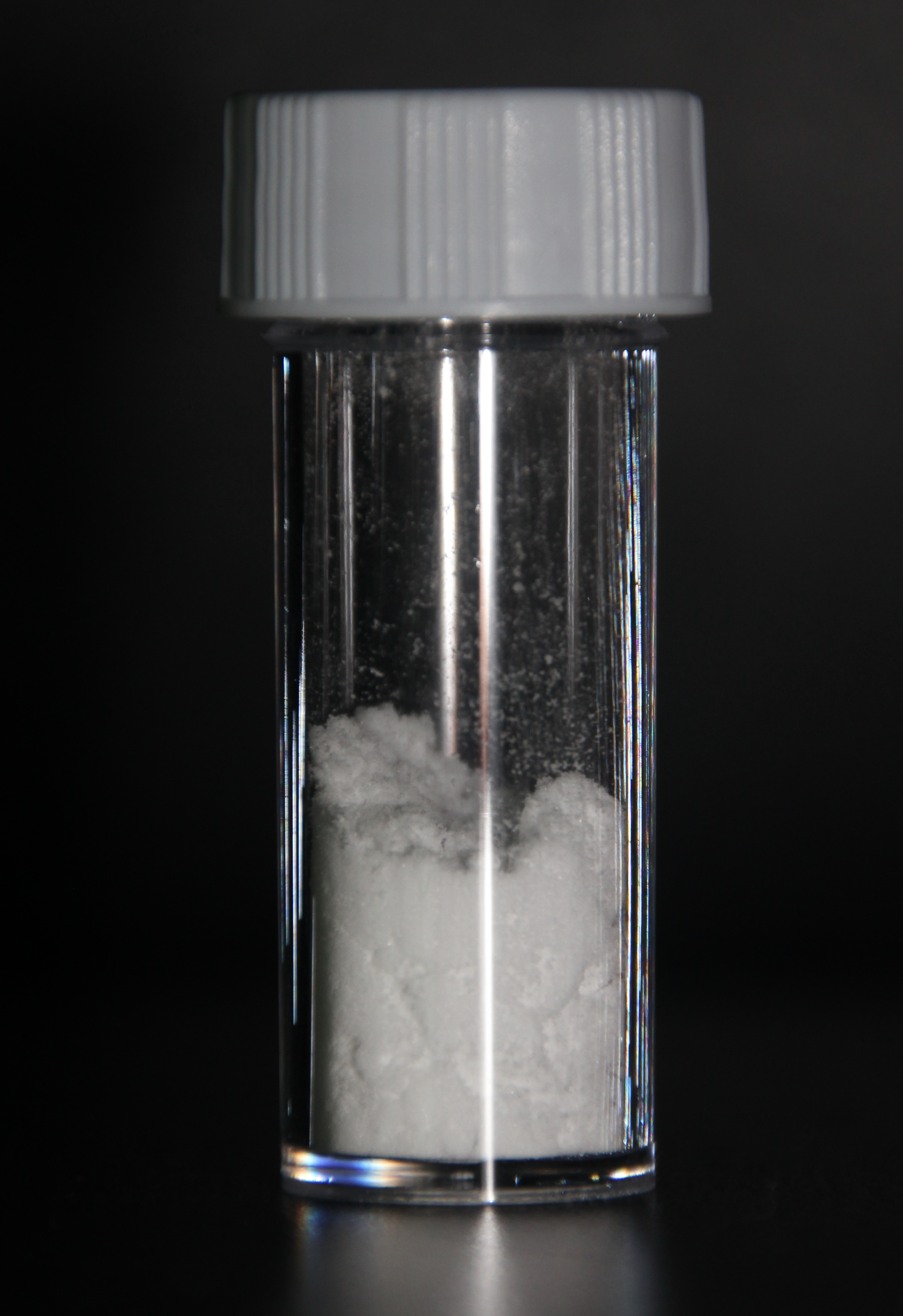

Names
- IUPAC name Glutamine
- Systematic IUPAC name 2-Amino-4-carbamoylbutanoic acid
- Other names L-Glutamine (levo)glutamide 2,5-Diamino-5-oxopentanoic acid 2-Amino-4-carbamoylbutanoic acid Endari

Identifiers
CAS Number	56-85-9
3D model (JSmol)	Interactive image; Zwitterion: Interactive image
Abbreviations	Gln, Q
ChEBI	CHEBI:18050
ChEMBL	ChEMBL930
ChemSpider	5746
DrugBank	DB00130
ECHA InfoCard	100.000.266
EC Number	200-292-1
IUPHAR/BPS	723
KEGG	C00303
PubChem CID	5961
UNII	0RH81L854J
CompTox Dashboard (EPA)	DTXSID1023100
- InChI: InChI=1S/C5H10N2O3/c6-3(5(9)10)1-2-4(7)8/h3H,1-2,6H2,(H2,7,8)(H,9,10)/t3-/m0/s1 Key: ZDXPYRJPNDTMRX-VKHMYHEASA-N
- SMILES: O=C(N)CCC(N)C(=O)O; Zwitterion: O=C(N)CCC([NH3+])C(=O)[O-]

Properties
Chemical formula	C_{5}H_{10}N_{2}O_{3}
Molar mass	146.146 g·mol^{−1}
Melting point	decomposes around 185°C
Solubility in water	soluble
Acidity (pK_{a})	2.2 (carboxyl), 9.1 (amino)
Chiral rotation ([α]_{D})	+6.5º (H_{2}O, c = 2)

Pharmacology
ATC code	A16AA03 (WHO)

Supplementary data page
- Glutamine (data page)
- Except where otherwise noted, data are given for materials in their standard state (at 25 °C [77 °F], 100 kPa). Infobox references

L-glutamine oral powder
Clinical data
- Trade names: Endari, Nutrestore
- AHFS/Drugs.com: Monograph
- MedlinePlus: a617035
- License data: US DailyMed: Glutamine
- Routes of administration: By mouth
- Drug class: Gastrointestinal agent
- ATC code: A16AA03 (WHO)

Legal status
- Legal status: US: ℞-only

Identifiers
- IUPAC name: (S)-2,5-diamino-5-oxopentanoic acid
- CAS Number: 56-85-9
- PubChem CID: 5961
- DrugBank: DB00130
- ChemSpider: 5746
- UNII: 0RH81L854J
- KEGG: D00015; C00064
- ChEBI: CHEBI:58359
- ChEMBL: ChEMBL930
- PDB ligand: GLN (PDBe, RCSB PDB)
- CompTox Dashboard (EPA): DTXSID1023100
- ECHA InfoCard: 100.000.266

Chemical and physical data
- Formula: C_{5}H_{10}N_{2}O_{3}
- Molar mass: 146.146 g·mol^{−1}
- 3D model (JSmol): Interactive image
- SMILES: C(CC(=O)N)C(C(=O)O)N
- InChI: InChI=1S/C5H10N2O3/c6-3(5(9)10)1-2-4(7)8/h3H,1-2,6H2,(H2,7,8)(H,9,10)/t3-/m0/s1; Key:ZDXPYRJPNDTMRX-VKHMYHEASA-N

Data page
- Glutamine (data page)

Glutamine ball and stick model spinning

Glutamine (symbol Gln or Q) is an α-amino acid that is used in the biosynthesis of proteins. Its side chain is similar to that of glutamic acid, except the carboxylic acid group is replaced by an amide. It is classified as a charge-neutral, polar amino acid. It is non-essential and conditionally essential in humans, meaning the body can usually synthesize sufficient amounts of it, but in some instances of stress, the body's demand for glutamine increases, and glutamine must be obtained from the diet. It is encoded by the codons CAA and CAG. It is named after glutamic acid, which in turn is named after its discovery in cereal proteins, gluten.

In human blood, glutamine is the most abundant free amino acid.

The dietary sources of glutamine include especially the protein-rich foods like beef, chicken, fish, dairy products, eggs, vegetables like beans, beets, cabbage, spinach, carrots, parsley, vegetable juices and also in wheat, papaya, Brussels sprouts, celery, kale and fermented foods like miso.

The one-letter symbol Q for glutamine was assigned in alphabetical sequence to N for asparagine, being larger by merely one methylene –CH2– group. Note that P was used for proline, and O was avoided due to similarity with D. The mnemonic Qlutamine was also proposed.

== Functions ==
Glutamine plays a role in a variety of biochemical functions:

- Protein synthesis, as any other of the 20 proteinogenic amino acids
- Lipid synthesis, especially by cancer cells.
- Regulation of acid-base balance in the kidney by producing ammonium
- Cellular energy, as a source, next to glucose
- Nitrogen donation for many anabolic processes, including the synthesis of purines
- Carbon donation, as a source, refilling the citric acid cycle
- Nontoxic transporter of ammonia in the blood circulation.

=== Roles in metabolism ===
Glutamine maintains redox balance by participating in glutathione synthesis and contributing to anabolic processes such as lipid synthesis by reductive carboxylation.

Glutamine provides a source of carbon and nitrogen for use in other metabolic processes. Glutamine is present in serum at higher concentrations than other amino acids and is essential for many cellular functions. Examples include the synthesis of nucleotides and non-essential amino acids. One of the most important functions of glutamine is its ability to be converted into α-KG, which helps to maintain the flow of the tricarboxylic acid cycle, generating ATP via the electron carriers NADH and FADH_{2}. The highest consumption of glutamine occurs in the cells of the intestines, kidney cells (where it is used for acid-base balance), activated immune cells, and many cancer cells.

== Production ==
Glutamine is produced industrially using Corynebacterium glutamicum, which gives ~40 g/L in 2 days using a glucose rich culture medium.

=== Biosynthesis ===
Glutamine synthesis from glutamate and ammonia is catalyzed by the enzyme glutamine synthetase. The majority of glutamine production occurs in muscle tissue, accounting for about 90% of all glutamine synthesized. Glutamine is also released, in small amounts, by the lungs and brain. Although the liver is capable of glutamine synthesis, its role in glutamine metabolism is more regulatory than productive, as the liver takes up glutamine derived from the gut via the hepatic portal system.

== Uses ==
=== Nutrition ===
Glutamine is the most abundant naturally occurring, nonessential amino acid in the human body, and one of the few amino acids that can directly cross the blood–brain barrier. Humans obtain glutamine through catabolism of proteins in foods they eat. In states where tissue is being built or repaired, like growth of babies, or healing from wounds or severe illness, glutamine becomes conditionally essential.

=== Sickle cell disease ===
In 2017, the U.S. Food and Drug Administration (FDA) approved L-glutamine oral powder, marketed as Endari, to reduce severe complications of sickle cell disease in people aged five years and older with the disorder.

The safety and efficacy of L-glutamine oral powder were studied in a randomized trial of subjects ages five to 58 years old with sickle cell disease who had two or more painful crises within the 12 months prior to enrollment in the trial. Subjects were assigned randomly to treatment with L-glutamine oral powder or placebo, and the effect of treatment was evaluated over 48 weeks. Subjects who were treated with L-glutamine oral powder experienced fewer hospital visits for pain treated with a parenterally administered narcotic or ketorolac (sickle cell crises), on average, compared to subjects who received a placebo (median 3 vs. median 4), fewer hospitalizations for sickle cell pain (median 2 vs. median 3), and fewer days in the hospital (median 6.5 days vs. median 11 days). Subjects who received L-glutamine oral powder also had fewer occurrences of acute chest syndrome (a life-threatening complication of sickle cell disease) compared with patients who received a placebo (8.6 percent vs. 23.1 percent).

Common side effects of L-glutamine oral powder include constipation, nausea, headache, abdominal pain, cough, pain in the extremities, back pain and chest pain.

L-glutamine oral powder received orphan drug designation. The FDA granted the approval of Endari to Emmaus Medical Inc.

=== Medical food ===
Glutamine is marketed as medical food and is prescribed when a medical professional believes a person in their care needs supplementary glutamine due to metabolic demands beyond what can be met by endogenous synthesis or diet.

== Safety ==
Glutamine is safe in adults and in preterm infants. Although glutamine is metabolized to glutamate and ammonia, both of which have neurological effects, their concentrations are not increased much, and no adverse neurological effects were detected. The observed safe level for supplemental L-glutamine in normal healthy adults is 14 g/day.

Adverse effects of glutamine have been described for people receiving home parenteral nutrition and those with liver-function abnormalities. Although glutamine has no effect on the proliferation of tumor cells, it is still possible that glutamine supplementation may be detrimental in some cancer types.

Ceasing glutamine supplementation in people adapted to very high consumption may initiate a withdrawal effect, raising the risk of health problems such as infections or impaired integrity of the intestine.

== Structure ==
Glutamine can exist in either of two enantiomeric forms, L-glutamine and D-glutamine. The L-form is found in nature. Glutamine contains an α-amino group which is in the protonated −NH^{+}_{3} form under biological conditions and a carboxylic acid group which is in the deprotonated −COO^{−} form, known as carboxylate, under physiological conditions.

Glutamine zwitterionic forms at neutral pH: L-glutamine (left) and D-glutamine

== Research ==
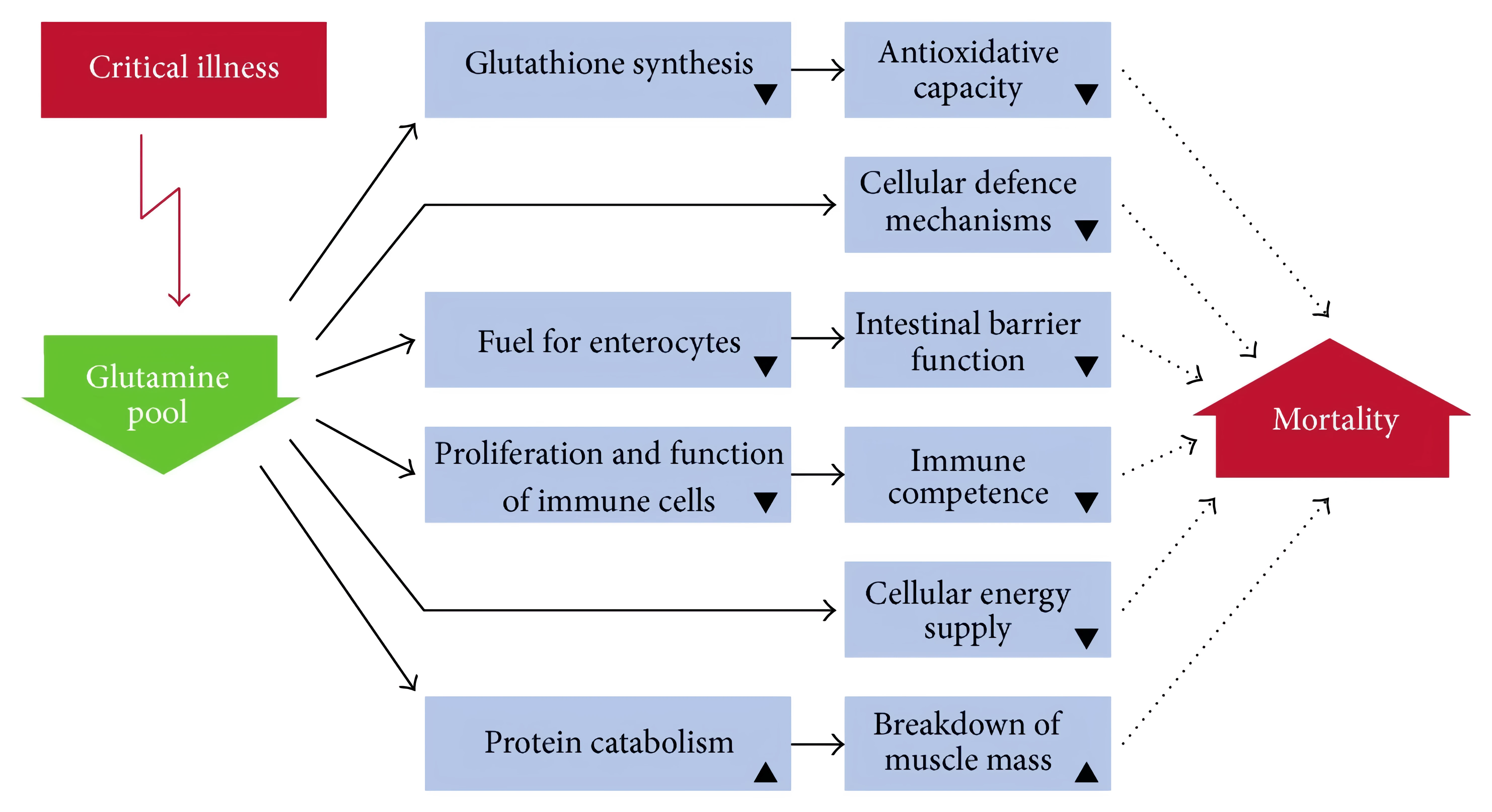
Consequences of glutamine depletion in critically ill individuals

Glutamine supplementation was investigated for its possible effects in critically ill people or after abdominal surgery, but the low quality of research prevented conclusions about any effect. Supplementation does not appear to have an effect in infants with significant stomach or intestinal disorders.

== Scientific application ==
Clinical studies have investigated glutamine supplementation for supporting gut barrier function. Several randomized controlled trials and meta-analyses report that oral or enteral glutamine can reduce markers of intestinal permeability in acute or short-term settings, such as following intense exercise or during critical illness; however, results across chronic inflammatory conditions are inconsistent.

Glutamine has also been studied for the prevention and management of chemotherapy- or radiation-induced oral and gastrointestinal mucositis. Multiple randomized trials and meta-analyses suggest that glutamine supplementation may reduce the incidence or severity of high-grade oral mucositis, although findings are heterogeneous and not all studies demonstrate benefit.

In chronic inflammatory bowel diseases, including Crohn's disease, systematic reviews (including Cochrane reviews) have concluded that current randomized evidence is insufficient to support glutamine supplementation for inducing remission or modifying disease progression, and further well-powered clinical trials are required. While commercial and lay sources describe plausible mechanisms by which glutamine may support intestinal barrier function, such claims should be interpreted in the context of available clinical evidence.

== See also ==
- Isoglutamine
- Trinucleotide repeat disorder
- PolyQ tract
