= Orthopedic oncologist =

Surgeon trained to examine bone tumors

An orthopedic (orthopaedic) oncologist is a physician and surgeon who specializes in the diagnoses and treatment of primary benign and malignant tumors of the bones. This is considered a sub-speciality or component of orthopaedic surgery. The specialist also will be involved in diagnosing, treating, and supporting or directing palliative care in people who are being treated for cancers involving the skeleton. Orthopedic oncologists often work alongside radiologists, pathologists, and other specialized oncologists and surgeons.

== Education ==
An orthopedic oncologist in the United States must complete 4 years of medical school. Following graduation from medical school, the completion of an orthopedic surgical residency (medicine) is required. This residency program is typically 5 years in length and focuses on general orthopedic surgical techniques for common orthopedic injuries. As the residency progresses, the level of injury, disease and trauma treated by the resident becomes increasingly complex. By completion of the residency program, the orthopedic surgeon should be able to competently diagnose and treat a variety of injury and trauma to the bony structures of the body.

At this point, most orthopedic physicians become attending doctors specializing in general Orthopedic surgery. However, aspiring orthopedic surgeons who wish to sub-specialize in orthopedic oncology must complete an additional phase to their training known as a fellowship (medicine). A fellowship in orthopedic oncology general lasts an additional one to two years following the completion of the residency. During this time, the physician will learn in depth about the pathology and treatment of various forms of primary benign and malignant neoplasms of the bones and bony structures of the human body (any cancer which has originated from the bone, as opposed to cancers which originated from other organs and have secondarily spread, or metastasized, to the bones, which is much more common; these specialists deal mostly with primary bone tumors). The physician will study directly under an experienced attending orthopedic oncologist with one-on-one mentoring. The fellowship is designed to be an intense immersion into a complex medical topic.

== Specializations ==
Due to the relative rarity of primary bone tumor in relation to other forms of cancer, there are fewer than two hundred orthopedic oncologists practicing around the United States, nearly all of whom work in major urban teaching hospitals. While general orthopedic surgeons may be qualified to perform surgical intervention on these tumors, it is advisable when confronted with primary malignancy of the bone to seek out the treatment of an orthopedic oncologist, due to their increased knowledge and experience dealing with these rare and very serious tumors.
