= CDT =

CDT or CdT may refer to:

== Medicine ==
- Carbohydrate deficient transferrin, a transporter protein isoform typically increased in alcoholism
- Compulsory drug test
- Current Dental Terminology, a coding system of the American Dental Association
- Cytolethal distending toxin, a bacterial genotoxin produced by Gram-negative bacteria
- Clock drawing test
- Clostridioides Difficile Toxin test that detects Clostridioides difficile toxin A and Clostridioides difficile toxin B

== Chemistry ==
- Cyclododecatriene, a cycloalkene used in the production of polyamides

== Organisations ==
- Canadian Deaf Theatre
- CD Tenerife (Club Deportivo Tenerife), a Spanish football club
- C.D. Tondela (Clube Desportivo de Tondela), a Portuguese football club
- Center for Democracy and Technology
- Centre for Doctoral Training or Doctoral Training Centre, an organisation of PhD programmes at UK universities
- Children's Dance Theatre, University of Utah
- China Datang Corporation, a power generation business in the People's Republic of China
- China Digital Times, a bilingual news website covering Chinese politics
- Confédération Démocratique du Travail:
  - Democratic Confederation of Labour (DRC), a trade union in the Democratic Republic of the Congo
  - Democratic Confederation of Labour (Morocco), a trade union
- Crimson Dance Team, of Harvard College
- Translation Centre for the Bodies of the European Union (Centre de Traduction des Organes de l'Union Européenne)

== Other ==
- Cañon Diablo troilite (pyrrhotite), a standard for comparing sulfur isotopes
- Causal dynamical triangulation, an approach to quantum gravity
- Causal decision theory, a school of thought within decision theory
- Central Daylight Time
  - Australia Central Daylight Time, a time zone in Australia
  - Central Daylight Time, observed in the North American Central Time Zone
- launch countdown time used by ISRO (similar to Mission Elapsed Time)
- CDT (TV station), a TV station in remote eastern and central Australia
- Centre Daily Times, a newspaper for Centre County, Pennsylvania
- Commandant, military title
- Conceptual dependency theory
- Constrained Delaunay triangulation
- Continental Divide Trail
- Craft, Design and Technology, a subject in schools in the United Kingdom
- Eclipse C/C++ Development Tooling, see Eclipse (software)
- IATA code of Castellón–Costa Azahar Airport
- MRT station abbreviation of Caldecott MRT station
- Colorado Department of Transportation
