= Democratic Confederation of Labour =

Democratic Confederation of Labour may mean:

- Democratic Confederation of Labour (DRC)
- Democratic Confederation of Labour (Morocco)
