= N00280 =

n00280
- Consensus secondary structure and sequence conservation of Clostridioides difficile sRNA included into helicase gene

Identifiers
- Symbol: n00280
- Rfam: RF03531

Other data
- RNA type: Gene; sRNA
- SO: SO:0000655
- PDB structures: PDBe

The n00280 RNA was identified by RNA deep sequencing of Clostridioides difficile 630 where it is located within gene CD0749 (putative DNA helicase, UvrD/REP type) in the same direction as the gene. A strong transcription start site for this RNA was experimentally confirmed, in the 3' region of gene CD0749. The 3' end of the sRNA has not been confirmed and its length was arbitrarily set to 100nt.

Only sequences from order Clostridiales were included in the family, mostly because the starting sequence belonged to this order and the large majority of sequences found by the different RFAM search iterations belonged to this order as well. Associated e-values did not exceed 1e-09. As the original RNA is part of a coding sequence, it is possible that homologies were detected due to selection pressure for the CDS rather than for a sRNA. R-scape identified only two significantly covarying pairs present in the structure (4-100 and 7-97). Thus evidence for structure is weak.
