= TcdE holin family =

The Clostridioides difficile TcdE Holin (TcdE Holin) Family (TC# 1.E.19) is a group of transporters belonging to the Holin Superfamily IV. A representative list of its members can be found in the Transporter Classification Database.

Toxigenic strains of C. difficile produce two large toxins (TcdA and TcdB) encoded within a pathogenicity locus. tcdE, encoded between tcdA and tcdB, encodes a 166 amino acyl (aa) protein which causes death to E. coli when expressed, and the structure of TcdE resembles holins. TcdE acts on the bacterial membrane. Since TcdA and TcdB lack signal peptides, they may be released via TcdE either prior to or subsequent to cell lysis. Other Clostridial species bear homologues of TcdE.

The transport reaction believed to be catalyzed by TcdE is:

Toxin (in) → Toxin (out)

== See also ==
- Holin
- Lysin
- Clostridioides difficile toxin A
- Clostridioides difficile toxin B
- Transporter Classification Database
