= Actoxumab =

Chemical compound

Monoclonal antibody
- Type: Whole antibody
- Source: Human
- Target: Clostridioides difficile toxin A

Clinical data
- ATC code: none

Identifiers
- CAS Number: 1245634-25-6
- ChemSpider: none
- UNII: G3LU5LC5SX
- KEGG: D10360

Chemical and physical data
- Formula: C_{6476}H_{10000}N_{1740}O_{2010}S_{45}
- Molar mass: 145836.11 g·mol^{−1}

Actoxumab is a human monoclonal antibody designed for the prevention of recurrence of Clostridioides difficile infection.

This drug, along with bezlotoxumab, was developed through Phase II efficacy trials by a partnership between Medarex Inc and MassBiologics of the University of Massachusetts Medical School. The project was then licensed to Merck & Co., Inc. for further development and commercialization.

A study compared it with bezlotoxumab (that targets CD toxin-B) and found Actoxumab less effective.
