= Saccharomyces boulardii =

Scientific classification
- Kingdom: Fungi
- Division: Ascomycota
- Subdivision: Saccharomycotina
- Class: Saccharomycetes
- Order: Saccharomycetales
- Family: Saccharomycetaceae
- Genus: Saccharomyces
- Species: S. boulardii

Binomial name
- Saccharomyces boulardii Seguela, Bastide & Massot, 1923 (nom. inval.)

Type strain
- Hansen CBS 5926

Synonyms
- S. cerevisiae var. boulardii

Species of fungus

Saccharomyces boulardii is a yeast first isolated in 1923 from lychee (Litchi chinensis) and mangosteen (Garcinia mangostana) fruit peels by the French scientist Henri Boulard. Early reports described S. boulardii as a distinct species with unique taxonomic, metabolic, and genetic characteristics; however, subsequent genomic analyses have shown that it is not a separate species but a lineage of Saccharomyces cerevisiae, sharing greater than 99% genomic sequence identity with other S. cerevisiae strains. As a result, it is often referred to as S. cerevisiae var. boulardii.

S. boulardii is used as a probiotic yeast, intended to transiently colonize the gastrointestinal tract and reduce the risk of certain gastrointestinal disorders. It is able to grow at human body temperature (37°C; 98.6°F). In healthy individuals, S. boulardii is generally regarded as nonpathogenic and nonsystemic, remaining confined to the gastrointestinal tract.

Henri Boulard reportedly became interested in the yeast after observing residents of Southeast Asia consuming lychee and mangosteen skins during cholera outbreaks, a practice believed to alleviate diarrheal symptoms.

S. boulardii has also been used as a model organism in molecular biology, and the CRISPR–Cas9 genome-editing system has been demonstrated to function effectively in this yeast.

== Biology and genetics ==
S. boulardii was originally described as a species distinct from S. cerevisiae based on phenotypic traits, including the inability to ferment galactose, a reported lack of sporulation under standard laboratory conditions, and increased tolerance to human body temperature, gastric acidity, and digestive enzymes compared with many S. cerevisiae strains. Subsequent molecular and genomic analyses, however, have shown that S. boulardii falls within the genetic diversity of S. cerevisiae, forming a distinct clade most closely related to wine-associated strains.

Like other S. cerevisiae strains, S. boulardii possesses 16 nuclear chromosomes and a 2-micron plasmid, and is diploid, carrying genetic determinants for both mating types (MATa and MATα). However, the MATa locus in S. boulardii contains mutations predicted to impair mating and sporulation, which may account for its reduced or absent sporulation phenotype under laboratory conditions.

S. boulardii shares with other S. cerevisiae strains the production of secreted proteins reported to interfere with certain bacterial pathogens and their toxins, including a 63-kDa phosphatase (Pho8) that reduces Escherichia coli endotoxin activity and a 54-kDa serine protease (Ysp3) capable of degrading Clostridioides difficile toxins A and B. An additional, as-yet-unidentified protein of approximately 120 kDa has been reported to inhibit cholera toxin–induced increases in intracellular cyclic AMP (cAMP).

In addition to these shared features, comparative studies have identified metabolic and immunoregulatory traits that distinguish S. boulardii from many other S. cerevisiae strains and may contribute to its probiotic activity. These include elevated production of acetate and succinate under aerobic conditions, enhanced anti-inflammatory effects in cell-based models, and selective activation of the aryl hydrocarbon receptor (AhR), a key regulator of intestinal immune homeostasis. S. boulardii also encodes additional copies of flocculin genes, which may promote interactions with bacterial pathogens and reduce their adherence to the intestinal mucus layer.

S. boulardii produces high amounts of the short-chain fatty acid acetic acid (acetate). This results in S. boulardii increasing acidity and having strong antibacterial properties. It also shows anti-inflammatory effects and can increase beneficial gut bacteria such as Akkermansiaceae and Bifidobacteriaceae via symbiotic mechanisms in preclinical research. The yeast has also been found to reverse antibiotic-induced gut dysbiosis in rodents, including restoring beneficial bacteria such as Lactobacillus, Bifidobacterium, Firmicutes, and Clostridium. This was associated with reduced neuroinflammation and related behavioral changes.

== Medical and clinical use ==
Saccharomyces boulardii
Clinical data
- Trade names: DiarSafe, Florastor
- ATC code: A07FA02 (WHO)

Legal status
- Legal status: US: Over-the-counter; EU: Rx & OTC; CN: Rx & OTC

The best-characterized reference (“type”) strain of S. boulardii is CBS 5926, which is also deposited under the culture collection numbers ATCC 74012 and CNCM I-745. This strain dominates commercial use of S. boulardii and is produced by the pharmaceutical company Biocodex; it has been evaluated in more than 90 randomized clinical trials. In addition to CNCM I-745, several manufacturers market S. boulardii supplements derived from distinct, often proprietary strains, including CNCM I-1079, CNCM I-3799, and DBVPG 6763, although it remains unclear whether it is genetically identical to CBS 5926.

=== Antibiotic-associated diarrhea ===
Evidence supports the use of S. boulardii for the prevention of antibiotic-associated diarrhea (AAD) in both adults and children. The efficacy of probiotics in preventing AAD appears to depend on the specific strain used and the administered dose. A 2015 meta-analysis of 21 randomized controlled trials involving 4,780 participants found that S. boulardii significantly reduced the risk of AAD in adults and children. High-dose probiotics, including S. boulardii and Lactobacillus rhamnosus (more than 5 billion colony-forming units per day), were reported to be moderately effective in preventing AAD in children and may also reduce the duration of diarrhea, without serious adverse effects.

=== Acute gastroenteritis ===
A position paper from the ESPGHAN Working Group for Probiotics and Prebiotics, based on systematic reviews and randomized controlled trials, suggested that S. boulardii may be considered as an adjunct to rehydration therapy in the management of acute gastroenteritis in children. The recommendation was classified as strong despite the underlying evidence being rated as low quality.

=== Blastocystosis ===
Limited evidence suggests that S. boulardii may have a beneficial role as an adjunct in the treatment of blastocystosis; however, the available data are derived from a small number of studies, and further research is needed to establish its efficacy.

=== Clostridioides difficile infection ===
S. boulardii has been associated with a reduction in recurrence rates among patients with recurrent Clostridioides difficile infection and may be effective as a secondary preventive intervention. Evidence does not support its use as a primary treatment for acute infection.

=== Helicobacter pylori infection ===
The addition of S. boulardii to standard triple therapy for the eradication of Helicobacter pylori infection has been associated with a modest but statistically significant increase in eradication rates in a meta-analysis. The same analysis also reported a significant reduction in common adverse effects of eradication therapy, including diarrhea and nausea.

=== HIV/AIDS-associated diarrhea ===
In a randomized controlled trial involving patients with advanced HIV/AIDS, S. boulardii supplementation was associated with a higher recovery rate from chronic diarrhea compared with placebo. Participants receiving S. boulardii also experienced weight gain, whereas those in the placebo group lost weight over the 18-month study period. No adverse reactions were reported in this immunocompromised population

=== Metabolic disorders ===
Preclinical evidence from animal models suggests that S. boulardii supplementation may reduce body weight in the context of type 2 diabetes; however, clinical evidence in humans is currently lacking. Additional studies in diet-induced obesity models further support these findings, showing that S. boulardii can attenuate weight gain, reduce food intake, and increase energy expenditure. These effects are accompanied by coordinated changes in gut microbiota composition, microbial metabolic activity, and host immune signaling, including reduced inflammatory pathways (e.g., TNFα/NF-κB) and shifts in metabolites linked to metabolic regulation, suggesting modulation of the gut–immune–metabolic axis.

== Food and beverage use ==
S. boulardii is usable in beer brewing, with live yeast remaining in the finished product. It can coexist alongside other S. cerevisiae in mixed starter cultures.

It can also be used for baking, where its ability to deter bacteria translates into inhibition of rope spoilage, a bread defect caused by Bacillus subtilis or Bacillus licheniformis contamination.

== Synthetic biology applications ==
In addition to its use as a naturally occurring probiotic, S. boulardii has attracted increasing interest as a chassis organism for synthetic biology and engineered microbial therapeutics. Its ability to survive gastrointestinal conditions, transiently persist in the gut, and its established safety record have motivated efforts to genetically modify S. boulardii for the localized delivery of therapeutic molecules. Engineered strains have been reported to express heterologous proteins such as the anti-inflammatory cytokine interleukin-10 (IL-10), with the aim of reducing intestinal inflammation, as well as peptide hormones including exendin-4, a glucagon-like peptide-1 (GLP-1) receptor agonist investigated for metabolic and endocrine applications. Other engineered variants have been designed to secrete antimicrobial peptides, toxin-neutralizing enzymes, or immunomodulatory metabolites, or to modulate short-chain fatty acid production. Collectively, these approaches position S. boulardii as a promising platform for next-generation live biotherapeutic products (also called advanced microbiome therapeutics), leveraging synthetic biology to extend its therapeutic potential beyond that of conventional probiotics.

== Safety and adverse effects ==
In immunocompromised individuals, S. boulardii has been associated with fungemia or localized infection, which may be fatal. Overall, S. boulardii is safe for use in otherwise healthy populations and fungemia with S. boulardii has not been reported, to the best of the recent evidence in immunocompetent patients. A review of HIV-1-infected patients given therapy with S. boulardii indicated it was safe. A retrospective study on 32,000 oncohematological hospitalized patients showed no occurrence of fungal sepsis with S. boulardii use.
