= Beta-1,3-glucosyltransferase =

Enzyme found in humans

B3GLCT

Identifiers
- Aliases: B3GLCT, B3GTL, B3Glc-T, Gal-T, beta3Glc-T, B3GALTL, beta 3-glucosyltransferase
- External IDs: OMIM: 610308; MGI: 2685903; GeneCards: B3GLCT

Gene location (Human)
Chr.	Chromosome 13 (human)
Band	13q12.3	Start	31,199,975 bp
Band	13q12.3	End	31,332,276 bp

Gene location (Mouse)
Chr.	Chromosome 5 (mouse)
Band	5|5 G3	Start	149,601,695 bp
Band	5|5 G3	End	149,686,064 bp
RNA expression pattern
Bgee	Human / Mouse (ortholog); Top expressed in: myocardium of left ventricle; Achilles tendon; cardiac muscle tissue of right atrium; right auricle of heart; tibialis anterior muscle; mucosa of ileum; smooth muscle tissue; endothelial cell; testicle; gonad / Top expressed in: ciliary body; iris; trigeminal ganglion; retinal pigment epithelium; otolith organ; utricle; ascending aorta; hand; vas deferens; lumbar spinal ganglion; More reference expression data
BioGPS	n/a
Gene ontology
Molecular function	transferase activity; glycosyltransferase activity; acetylglucosaminyltransferase activity
Cellular component	integral component of membrane; endoplasmic reticulum membrane; endoplasmic reticulum; membrane
Biological process	fucose metabolic process; protein glycosylation; protein O-linked fucosylation; carbohydrate metabolic process
Sources:Amigo / QuickGO
Orthologs
Databases	NCBI: entry; OMA: entry
Species	Human	Mouse
Entrez	145173	381694
Ensembl	ENSG00000187676	ENSMUSG00000051950
UniProt	Q6Y288	Q8BHT6
RefSeq (mRNA)	NM_194318	NM_001081204
RefSeq (protein)	NP_919299	NP_001074673
Location (UCSC)	Chr 13: 31.2 – 31.33 Mb	Chr 5: 149.6 – 149.69 Mb
PubMed search
- Wikidata
View/Edit Human	View/Edit Mouse

Beta-1,3-glucosyltransferase is an enzyme that in humans is encoded by the B3GLCT gene (previously B3GALTL). This glucosyltransferase enzyme is involved in a type of protein modification called O-linked fucosylation. It catalyzes the reaction:

3-O-(alpha-L-fucosyl)-L-seryl-[protein] + UDP-alpha-D-glucose → 3-O-(beta-D-glucosyl-(1->3)-alpha-L-fucosyl)-L-seryl-[protein] + UDP + H^{+}

== Medical significance ==
Pathogenic mutations in B3GLCT are associated with Peters-plus syndrome, whose symptoms include developmental delay, small stature, and atypical skull and facial features.
