= MP4 holin family =

The Mycobacterial 4 TMS Phage Holin (MP4 Holin) Family (TC# 1.E.40) is a group of transporters belonging to Holin superfamily IV. A representative list of members belonging to the MP4 holin family can be found in the Transporter Classification Database.

A member of the Mycobacterial 4 transmembrane segment (TMS) Phage Holin family was first identified by Catalao et al. This small family includes several 4 TMS homologues, from mycobacterial phage and cyanobacteria.

== See also ==
- Holin
- Lysin
- Transporter Classification Database
