= Holin superfamily IV =

The Holin superfamily IV is a superfamily of integral membrane transport proteins. It is one of the seven different holin superfamilies in total.

The Holin superfamily IV includes the TC families:

- 1.E.10 - The Bacillus subtilis φ29 Holin (φ29 Holin) Family
- 1.E.16 - The Cph1 Holin (Cph1 Holin) Family
- 1.E.19 - The Clostridioides difficile TcdE Holin (TcdE Holin) Family
- 1.E.40 - The Mycobacterial 4 TMS Phage Holin (MP4 Holin) Family

Superfamily IV includes four TC families, which includes members from Bacillota, Actinomycetota and Fusobacteriota. Their average sizes are (in amino acyl residues (aas)):

TC# 1.E.10 - 138 ± 6 aas

TC# 1.E.16 - 149 ± 15 aas

TC# 1.E.19 - 141 ± 12 aas

TC# 1.E.40 - 173 ± 149 aas

Thus, there is very little size variation among family members, except for family 40, which has members larger than the other proteins in this superfamily. All members of families 10 and 19 and many members of family 16 appear to have 3 transmembrane segments (TMSs), but some members of this last family are predicted to have 4 TMSs. The extra TMS in these proteins is at their N-termini.

== See also ==
- Holin
- Lysin
- Transporter Classification Database
