= Blastocystosis =

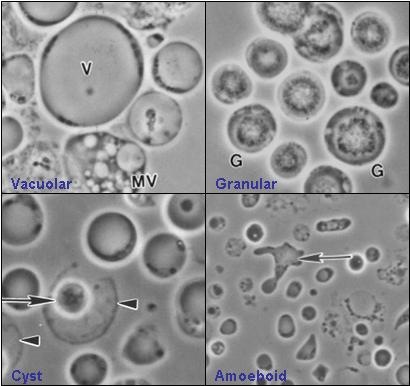
- Specialty: Infectious diseases

Blastocystosis refers to a medical condition caused by infection with Blastocystis. Blastocystis is a protozoal, single-celled parasite that inhabits the gastrointestinal tracts of humans and other animals. Many different types of Blastocystis exist, and they can infect humans, farm animals, birds, rodents, amphibians, reptiles, fish, and even cockroaches. Blastocystosis has been found to be a possible risk factor for the development of irritable bowel syndrome.

== Signs and symptoms ==
Researchers have published conflicting reports concerning whether Blastocystis causes symptoms in humans, with one of the earliest reports in 1916. The incidence of reports associated with symptoms began to increase in 1984, with physicians from Saudi Arabia reporting symptoms in humans and US physicians reporting symptoms in individuals with travel to less developed countries. A lively debate ensued in the early 1990s, with some physicians objecting to publication of reports that Blastocystis caused disease. Some researchers believe the debate has been resolved by finding of multiple species of Blastocystis that can infect humans, with some causing symptoms and others being harmless (see Genetics and Symptoms).

A few of most commonly reported symptoms are:

- abdominal pain
- itching, usually anal itching
- constipation
- diarrhea
- watery or loose stools
- weight loss
- fatigue
- flatulence

Some less commonly reported symptoms include:

- Skin rash
- Arthritic symptoms and joint pain
- Intestinal inflammation

=== Variation in severity ===
Researchers have sought to develop models to understand the variety of symptoms seen in humans. Some patients do not have symptoms, while others report severe diarrhea and fatigue.

A number of researchers have investigated the possibility that some species of Blastocystis are more virulent than others. An Italian researcher reported differences in the protein profiles of isolates associated with chronic and acute infection. A research team from Malaysia reported that isolates from symptomatic patients produced large amoeboid forms that were not present in isolates from asymptomatic patients. The development of a classification system for Blastocystis in 2007 produced a series of studies investigating this possibility.

The studies that followed generally found that no specific "pathogenic" or nonpathogenic species of Blastocystis exists. One study investigated the subtypes found in patients with irritable bowel syndrome (IBS), inflammatory bowel disease (IBD), and chronic diarrhea, and found the subtypes in these diseases were similar (subtypes 2 and 3), and have also been found in asymptomatic carriers. The researchers concluded that host factors, such as age and genetics, may play the dominant role in determining the symptoms seen in the disease.

=== Associations ===
Blastocystis colonisation is positively associated with IBS and is a possible risk factor for developing IBS. A study of IBS patients in the Middle East showed a "significantly increased" immune reaction in IBS patients to Blastocystis, even when the organism could not be identified in stool samples.

The following reports have linked Blastocystis infection to inflammatory bowel disease:

- A study using riboprinting identified specific types of Blastocystis as associated with inflammation.
- A case report described IBD in conjunction with Blastocystis infection.
- Three research groups have reported experimental infection of mice with Blastocystis produces intestinal inflammation.

== Transmission and risk factors ==
Humans contract Blastocystis infection by drinking water or eating food contaminated with feces from an infected human or animal. Blastocystis infection can be spread from animals to humans, from humans to other humans, from humans to animals, and from animals to animals. Risk factors for infection have been reported as following:

- International travel: Travel to less developed countries has been cited in development of symptomatic Blastocystis infection. A 1986 study in the United States found that all individuals symptomatically infected with Blastocystis reported recent travel history to less developed countries. In the same study, all hospital employees working in New York who were screened for Blastocystis were found to have asymptomatic infections.
- Military service: Several studies have identified high rates of infection in military personnel. An early account described infection of British troops in Egypt in 1916 who recovered following treatment with emetine. A 1990 study published in Military Medicine from Lackland AFB in Texas concluded symptomatic infection was more common in foreign nationals, children, and immunocompromised individuals. A 2002 study published in Military Medicine of army personnel in Thailand identified a 44% infection rate. Infection rates were highest in privates who had served the longest at the army base. A follow-up study found a significant correlation between infection and symptoms, and identified the most likely cause as contaminated water. A 2007 newspaper article suggested the infection rate of US military personnel returning from the Gulf War was 50%, quoting the head of Oregon State University's Biomedicine department.
- Consumption of Untreated Water (well water): Many studies have linked Blastocystis infection with contaminated drinking water. A 1993 study of children infected symptomatically with Blastocystis in Pittsburgh indicated that 75% of them had a history of drinking well water or travel in less developed countries. Two studies in Thailand linked Blastocystis infection in military personnel and families to drinking of unboiled and untreated water. A book published in 2006 noted that in an Oregon community, infections are more common in winter months during heavy rains. A research study published in 1980 reported bacterial contamination of well water in the same community during heavy rainfall. A 2007 study from China specifically linked infection with Blastocystis sp. subtype 3 with drinking untreated water. Recreational contact with untreated water, for example through boating, has also been identified as a risk factor. Studies have shown that Blastocystis survives sewage treatment plants in both the United Kingdom and Malaysia. Blastocystis cysts have been shown to be resistant to chlorination as a treatment method and are among the most resistant cysts to ozone treatment.
- Contaminated Food: Contamination of leafy vegetables has been implicated as a potential source for transmission of Blastocystis infection, as well as other gastrointestinal protozoa. A Chinese study identified infection with Blastocystis sp. subtype 1 as specifically associated with eating foods grown in untreated water.
- Daycare facilities: A Canadian study identified an outbreak of Blastocystis associated with daycare attendance. Prior studies have identified outbreaks of similar protozoal infections in daycares.
- Geography: Infection rates vary geographically, and variants which produce symptoms may be less common in industrialized countries. For example, a low incidence of Blastocystis infection has been reported in Japan. A study of individuals infected with Blastocystis in Japan found that many (43%, 23/54) carried Blastocystis sp. subtype 2, which was found to produce no symptoms in 93% (21/23) of patients studied, in contrast to other variants which were less common but produced symptoms in 50% of Japanese individuals. Studies in urban areas of industrialized countries have found Blastocystis infection associated with a low incidence of symptoms. In contrast, studies in developing countries generally show Blastocystis to be associated with symptoms. In the United States, a higher incidence of Blastocystis infection has been reported in California and West Coast states.
- Prevalence over Time: A 1989 study of the prevalence of Blastocystis in the United States found an infection rate of 2.6% in samples submitted from all 48 states. The study was part of the CDC's MMWR Report. A more recent study, in 2006, found an infection rate of 23% in samples submitted from all 48 states. However, the more recent study was performed by a private laboratory located in the Western US, and emphasized samples from Western states, which have previously been reported to have a higher infection rate.

Research studies have suggested the following items are not risk factors for contracting Blastocystis infection:

- Consumption of municipal water near water plant (not a risk factor): One study showed that municipal water was free of Blastocystis, even when drawn from a polluted source. However, samples taken far away from the treatment plant showed cysts. The researchers suggested that aging pipes may permit intrusion of contaminated water into the distribution system.
- Human-to-Human transmission among adults (not a risk factor): Some research suggests that direct human-to-human transmission is less common even in households and between married partners. One study showed different members of the same household carried different subtypes of Blastocystis.

== Pathogeneses ==
Pathogenesis refers to the mechanism by which an organism causes disease. The following disease-causing mechanisms have been reported in studies of Blastocystis infection:

- Barrier disruption: In isolates from Blastocystis sp. subtype 4, study has demonstrated that Blastocystis has the ability to alter the arrangement of F-actin in intestinal epithelial cells. Actin filaments are important in stabilizing tight junctions; they in turn stabilize the barrier, which is a layer of cells, between the intestinal epithelial cells and the intestinal content. The parasite causes the actin filaments to rearrange, and so compromising barrier function. This has been suggested to contribute to the diarrheal symptoms sometimes observed in Blastocystis patients.
- Invasiveness: Invasive infection has been reported in humans and animal studies.
- Immune modulation: Blastocystis has been shown to provoke cells from the human colon to produce inflammatory cytokines interleukin-8 and GM-CSF. Interleukin-8 plays a role in rheumatoid arthritis.
- Protease secretion: Blastocystis secretes a protease that breaks up antibodies produced and secreted into the gastrointestinal tract lumen. These antibodies, known as immunoglobulin A (IgA), make up the immune defense system of human by preventing the growth of harmful microorganisms in the body and by neutralizing toxins secreted by these microorganisms. By breaking up the antibodies, it allows the persistence of Blastocystis in the human gut. Another more recent study has also shown and proposed that, in response to the proteases secreted by Blastocystis, the intestinal host cells would signal a series of events to be carried out, eventually leading to the self-destruction of the host cells – a phenomenon known as apoptosis.
- Other secretory mechanism: A study of a different protozoan which produces similar symptoms, Entamoeba histolytica, found that organism secretes several neurologically active chemicals, such as serotonin and Substance P. Serum levels of serotonin have been found to be elevated in patients with Entamoeba histolytica.

== Diagnosis ==
=== Clinically available ===
Diagnosis is performed by determining if the infection is present, and then making a decision as to whether the infection is responsible for the symptoms. Diagnostic methods in clinical use have been reported to be of poor quality and more reliable methods have been reported in research papers.

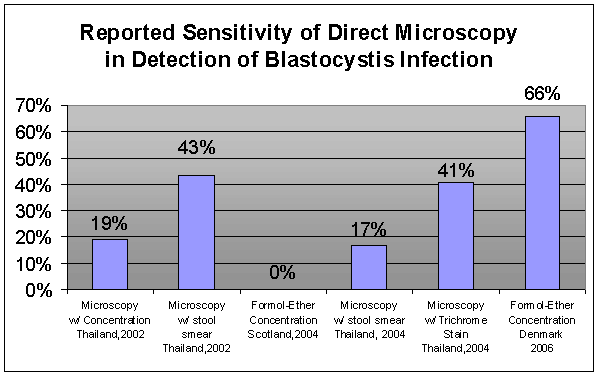
Percentage of Blastocystis infections detected by direct microscopy in various studies

For identification of infection, the only method clinically available in most areas is the ova and parasite (O&P) exam, which identifies the presence of the organism by microscopic examination of a chemically preserved stool specimen. This method is sometimes called direct microscopy. In the United States, pathologists are required to report the presence of Blastocystis when found during an O&P exam, so a special test does not have to be ordered. Direct microscopy is inexpensive, as the same test can identify a variety of gastrointestinal infections, such as Giardia, Entamoeba histolytica, and Cryptosporidium. However, one laboratory director noted that pathologists using conventional microscopes failed to identify many Blastocystis infections, and indicated the necessity for special microscopic equipment for identification. The following table shows the sensitivity of Direct Microscopy in detecting Blastocystis when compared to stool culture, a more sensitive technique. Stool culture was considered by some researchers to be the most reliable technique, but a recent study found stool culture only detected 83% of individuals infected when compared to polymerase chain reaction (PCR) testing.

Reasons given for the failure of Direct Microscopy include: (1) Variable Shedding: The quantity of Blastocystis organisms varies substantially from day to day in infected humans and animals; (2) Appearance: Some forms of Blastocystis resemble fat cells or white blood cells, making it difficult to distinguish the organism from other cells in the stool sample; (3) Large number of morphological forms: Blastocystis cells can assume a variety of shapes, some have been described in detail only recently, so it is possible that additional forms exist but have not been identified.

Several methods have been cited in literature for determination of the significance of the finding of Blastocystis:

1. Diagnosis only when large numbers of organism present: Some physicians consider Blastocystis infection to be a cause of illness only when large numbers are found in stool samples. Researchers have questioned this approach, noting that it is not used with any other protozoal infections, such as Giardia or Entamoeba histolytica. Some researchers have reported no correlation between number of organisms present in stool samples and the level of symptoms. A study using polymerase chain reaction testing of stool samples suggested that symptomatic infection can exist even when sufficient quantities of the organism do not exist for identification through Direct Microscopy.
2. Diagnosis-by-exclusion: Some physicians diagnose Blastocystis infection by excluding all other causes, such as infection with other organisms, food intolerances, colon cancer, etc. This method can be time-consuming and expensive, requiring many tests such as endoscopy and colonoscopy.
3. Disregarding Blastocystis : In the early to mid-1990s, some US physicians suggested all findings of Blastocystis are insignificant. No recent publications expressing this opinion could be found.

=== Not clinically available ===
The following diagnostic methods are not routinely available to patients. Researchers have reported that they are more reliable at detecting infection, and in some cases can provide the physician with information to help determine whether Blastocystis infection is the cause of the patient's symptoms:

Serum antibody testing: A 1993 research study performed by the NIH with United States patients suggested that it was possible to distinguish symptomatic and asymptomatic infection with Blastocystis using serum antibody testing. The study used blood samples to measure the patient's immune reaction to chemicals present on the surface of the Blastocystis cell. It found that patients diagnosed with symptomatic Blastocystis infection exhibited a much higher immune response than controls who had Blastocystis infection but no symptoms. The study was repeated in 2003 at Ain Shams University in Egypt with Egyptian patients with equivalent results.

Fecal antibody testing: A 2003 study at Ain Shams University in Egypt indicated that patients symptomatically infected could be distinguished with a fecal antibody test. The study compared patients diagnosed with symptomatic Blastocystis infection to controls who had Blastocystis infection but no symptoms. In the group with symptoms, IgA antibodies to Blastocystis were detected in fecal specimens that were not present in the healthy control group.

Stool culture: Culturing has been shown to be a more reliable method of identifying infection. In 2006, researchers reported the ability to distinguish between disease causing and non-disease causing isolates of Blastocystis using stool culture. Blastocystis cultured from patients who were sick and diagnosed with Blastocystis infection produced large, highly adhesive amoeboid forms in culture. These cells were absent in Blastocystis cultures from healthy controls. Subsequent genetic analysis showed the Blastocystis from healthy controls was genetically distinct from that found in patients with symptoms. Protozoal culture is unavailable in most countries due to the cost and lack of trained staff able to perform protozoal culture.

Genetic analysis of isolates: Researchers have used techniques which allow the DNA of Blastocystis to be isolated from fecal specimens. This method has been reported to be more reliable at detecting Blastocystis in symptomatic patients than stool culture. This method also allows the species group of Blastocystis to be identified. Research is continuing into which species groups are associated with symptomatic (see Genetics and Symptoms) blastocystosis.

Immuno-fluorescence (IFA) stain: An IFA stain causes Blastocystis cells to glow when viewed under a microscope, making the diagnostic method more reliable. IFA stains are in use for Giardia and Cryptosporidium for both diagnostic purposes and water quality testing. A 1991 paper from the NIH described the laboratory development of one such stain. However, no company currently offers this stain commercially.

=== Classification ===
Reports conflict regarding whether Blastocystis causes disease in humans. These reports resulted in a brief debate in medical journals in the early 1990s between some physicians in the United States who believed that Blastocystis was harmless, and physicians in the United States and overseas who believed it could cause disease.

At the time, it was common practice to identify all Blastocystis from humans as Blastocystis hominis, while Blastocystis from animals was identified differently (e.g. Blastocystis ratti from rats). Research performed since then has shown that the concept of Blastocystis hominis as a unique species of Blastocystis infecting humans is not supported by microbiological findings. Although one species group associated with primates was found, it was also discovered that humans can acquire infection from any one of nine species groups of Blastocystis which are also carried by cattle, pigs, rodents, chickens, pheasants, monkeys, dogs, and other animals. Research has suggested that some types produce few or no symptoms, while others produce illness and intestinal inflammation. Researchers have suggested conflicting reports may be due to the practice of naming all Blastocystis from humans Blastocystis hominis and have proposed discontinuing the use of that term.

A standard naming system for Blastocystis organisms from humans and animals has been proposed which names Blastocystis isolates according to the genetic identity of the Blastocystis organism rather than the host. The naming system used identifies all isolates as Blastocystis sp. subtype nn where nn is a number from 1 to 9 indicating the species group of the Blastocystis organism. The identification of the species can not be performed with a microscope at this time, because the different species look alike. Identification requires equipment for genetic analysis that is common in microbiology laboratories, but not available to most physicians. Some new scientific papers have begun using the standard naming system.

== Treatment ==
There is a lack of scientific study to support the efficacy of any particular treatment. An additional review published in 2009 made a similar conclusion, noting that because the diagnostics in use have been unreliable, it has been impossible to determine whether a drug has eradicated the infection, or just made the patient feel better. Historical reports, such as one from 1916, note difficulty associated with eradication of Blastocystis from patients, describing it as "an infection that is hard to get rid of."

A 1999 in vitro study from Pakistan found 40% of isolates are resistant to common antiprotozoal drugs. A study of isolates from patients diagnosed with IBS found 40% of isolates resistant to metronidazole and 32% resistant to furazolidone. Drugs reported in studies to be effective in eradicating Blastocystis infection have included metronidazole, trimethoprim, TMP-SMX (only trimethoprim is active with sulphamethoxazole demonstrating no activity), tetracycline, doxycycline, nitazoxanide, pentamidine, paromomycin and iodoquinol. Iodoquinol has been found to be less effective in practice than in-vitro. Miconazole and quinacrine have been reported as effective agents against Blastocystis growth in-vitro. Rifaximin, and albendazole have shown promise as has ivermectin which demonstrated high effectiveness against blastocystis hominis isolates in an in vitro study. There is also evidence that the probiotic yeast Saccharomyces boulardii, and the plant Mallotus oppositifolius may be effective against Blastocystis infections.

Physicians have described the successful use of a variety of discontinued antiprotozoals in treatment of Blastocystis infection. Emetine was reported as successful in cases in early 20th century with British soldiers who contracted Blastocystis infection while serving in Egypt. In vitro testing showed emetine was more effective than metronidazole or furazolidone. Emetine is available in the United States through special arrangement with the Centers for Disease Control. Clioquinol (Entero-vioform) was noted as successful in treatment of Blastocystis infection but removed from the market following an adverse event in Japan. Stovarsol and Narsenol, two arsenic-based antiprotozoals, were reported to be effective against the infection. Carbarsone was available as an anti-infective compound in the United States as late as 1991, and was suggested as a possible treatment. The reduction in the availability of antiprotozoal drugs has been noted as a complicating factor in treatment of other protozoal infections. For example, in Australia, production of diloxanide furoate ended in 2003, paromomycin is available under special access provisions, and the availability of iodoquinol is limited.

== Epidemiology ==
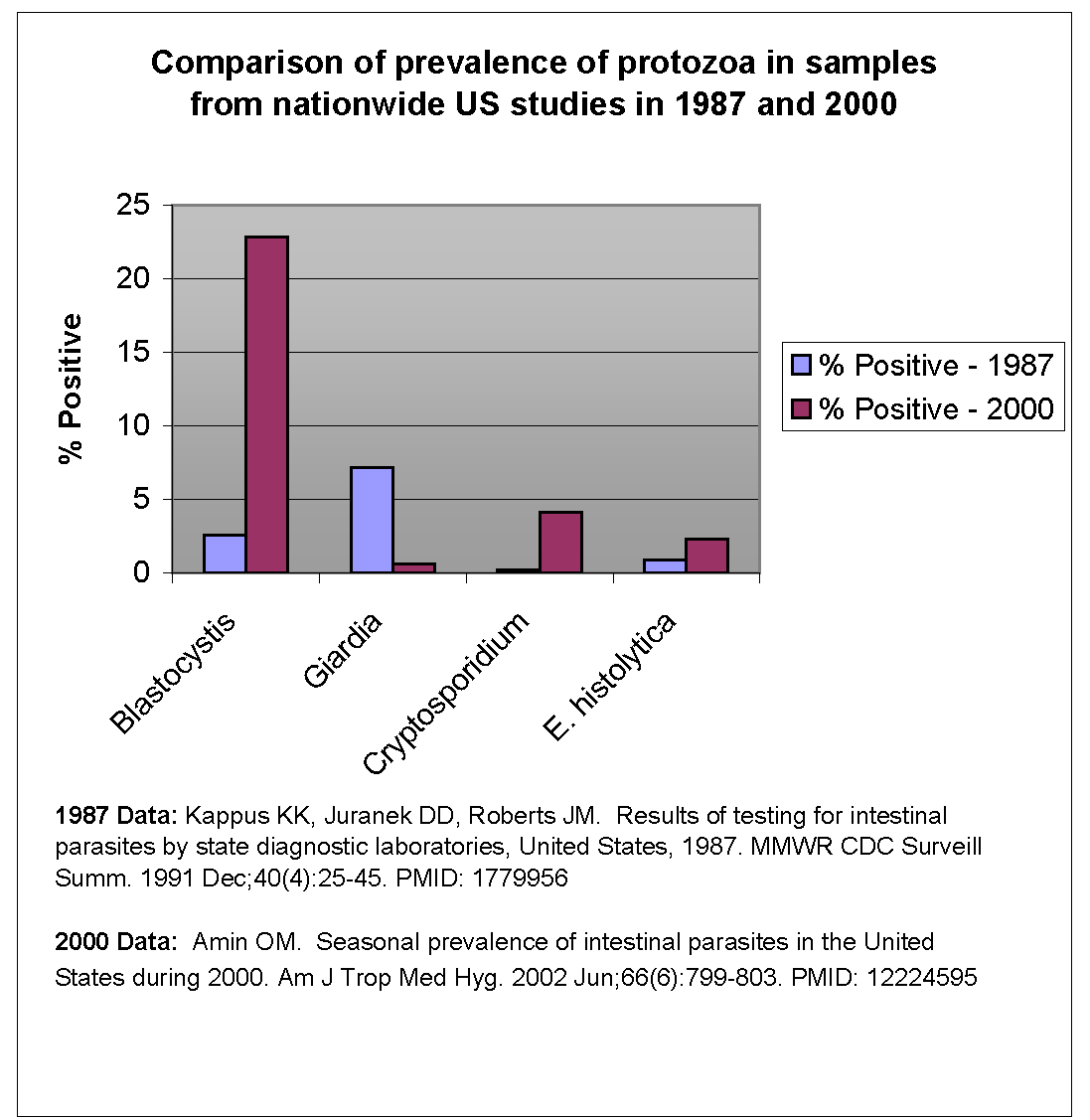
Percentage of stool samples from US states found to contain various protozoa in 1987 and 2000

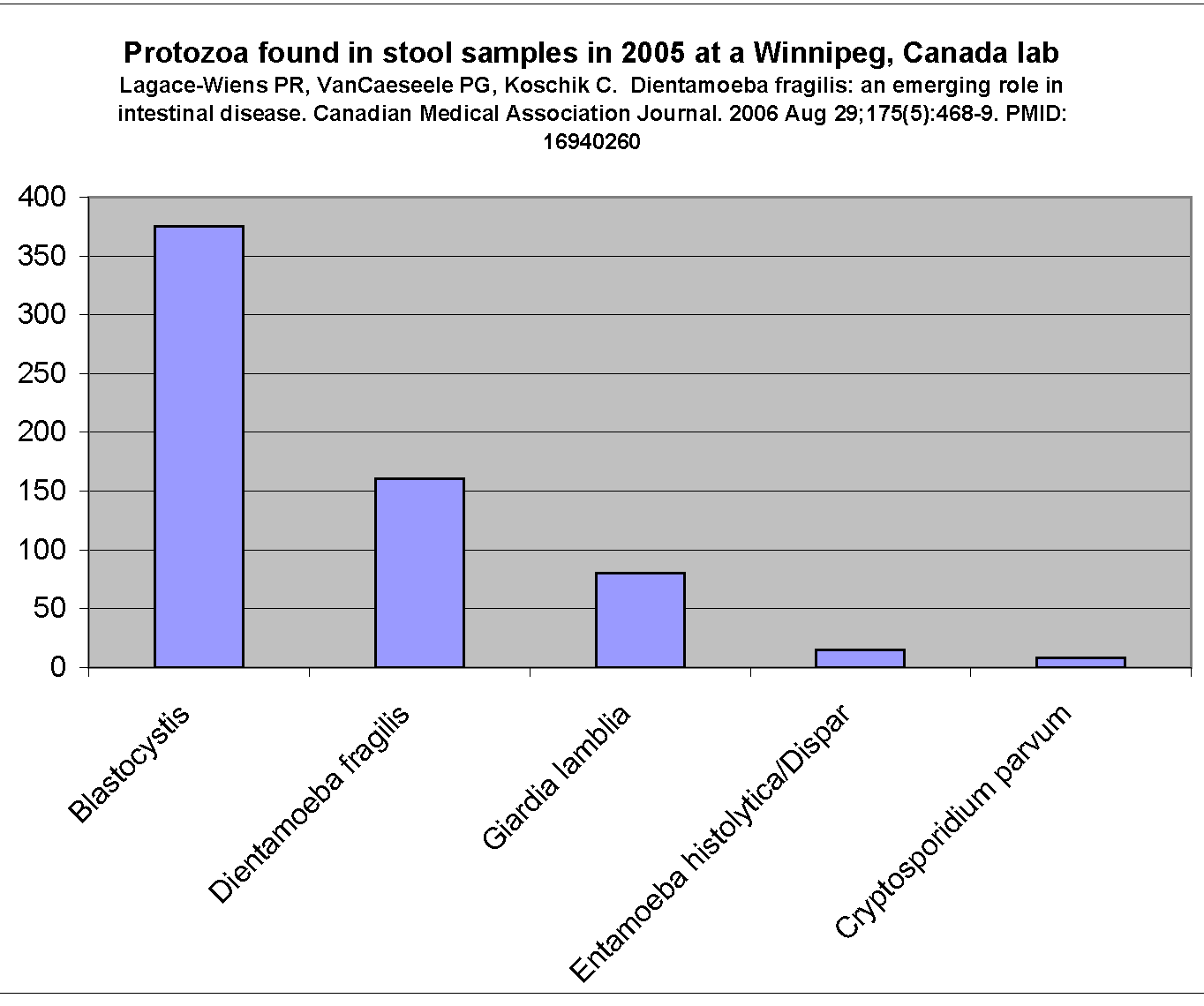
Number of stool samples from Canadian lab found to contain various protozoa in 2005

Like other protozoal infections, the prevalence of Blastocystis infection varies depending on the area investigated and the population selected. A number of different species groups of Blastocystis infect humans, with some being reported to cause disease while others do not. To date, surveys have not distinguished between different types of Blastocystis in humans, so the significance of findings may be difficult to evaluate. Developing countries have been reported to have higher incidences, but recent studies suggest that symptomatic infection with Blastocystis may be prevalent in certain industrialized countries, as well.

- A study on parasites in stool samples in the United States during 2000 found blastocystosis to be the most common parasitic infection in the population, occurring in 23% of individuals.
- A Canadian study of samples received in 2005 identified Blastocystis as the most prevalent protozoal infection identified.
- A study in Pakistan identified Blastocystis infection in 7% of the general population and 46% of patients with irritable bowel syndrome. The study used stool culture for identification.
- A 2014 study of samples from 93 children from the Senegal River basin found that 100% of the population was infected with Blastocystis.

== Other animals ==
Experimental infection in immunocompetent and immunocompromised mice has produced intestinal inflammation, altered bowel habits, lethargy, and death. Chronic diarrhea has been reported in non-human higher primates.

== Research ==
While many enteric protists are the subject of research, Blastocystis is unusual in that basic questions concerning how it should be diagnosed and treated and how it causes disease remain unsettled. The following groups have ongoing research programs directed at these questions:

Country	Organization	Year Established	Research focus	Research
Singapore	National University of Singapore	1991	Co-culture, pathogenesis	Tan Singh
Malaysia	University of Malaya	1996	Ultrastructure, pathogenicity	Kumar
United States	Blastocystis Research Foundation	2006	Phylogenetics, pathogenicity, treatment	Article
Denmark	Statens Serum Institut	2006	Diagnostics	Stensvold CR

== See also ==
- Blastocystis
- List of parasites (human)
- History of emerging infectious diseases
