= Phi29 holin family =

The Bacillus subtilis φ29 Holin (φ29 Holin) Family (TC# 1.E.10) is a group of transporters belonging to the Holin Superfamily IV. A representative list of members belonging to the φ29 holin family can be found in the Transporter Classification Database.

The phage φ29 gene 14 encodes the protein GP14 (TC# 1.E.10.1.1) which is required for phage φ29-promoted host cell lysis. When expressed in E. coli, it leads to cell death without lysis. When expressed together with phage φ29 lysozyme or an unrelated murein-degrading enzyme, cell lysis is also observed. Thus, GP14 is a nonspecific holin in the cytoplasmic membrane of B. subtilis. It is identical to the phage PZA lysis protein and nearly identical to the phage B103 lysis protein. It is 34% identical to the phage GA-1 holin.

== See also ==
- Holin
- Lysin
- Transporter Classification Database
