= Cph1 holin family =

The Cph1 Holin Family (TC# 1.E.16) is also called the CDD Holin 4 superfamily, but belongs to the Holin Superfamily IV as classified in the Transporter Classification Database (TCDB). A representative list of members belonging to the Cph1 family can be found in TCDB.

== See also ==
- Holin
- Lysin
- Transporter Classification Database
