= Henri Boulard =

French microbiologist

Henri Boulard was a French microbiologist who discovered the yeast Saccharomyces boulardii in 1923. He noticed people chewing on the skins of lychees and mangosteens to treat diarrhea during a cholera epidemic. He isolated and identified this strain of yeast, a probiotic. He sold his patented strain of Saccharomyces boulardii to Biocodex, a French pharmaceutical company in the 1950s. This probiotic is used to improve gut health and treat diarrhea and is available in over 100 countries as Florastor.

An award named after him given to those helping worldwide health was established in 2021.
