= Canadian Deaf Theatre =

Canadian theatre company

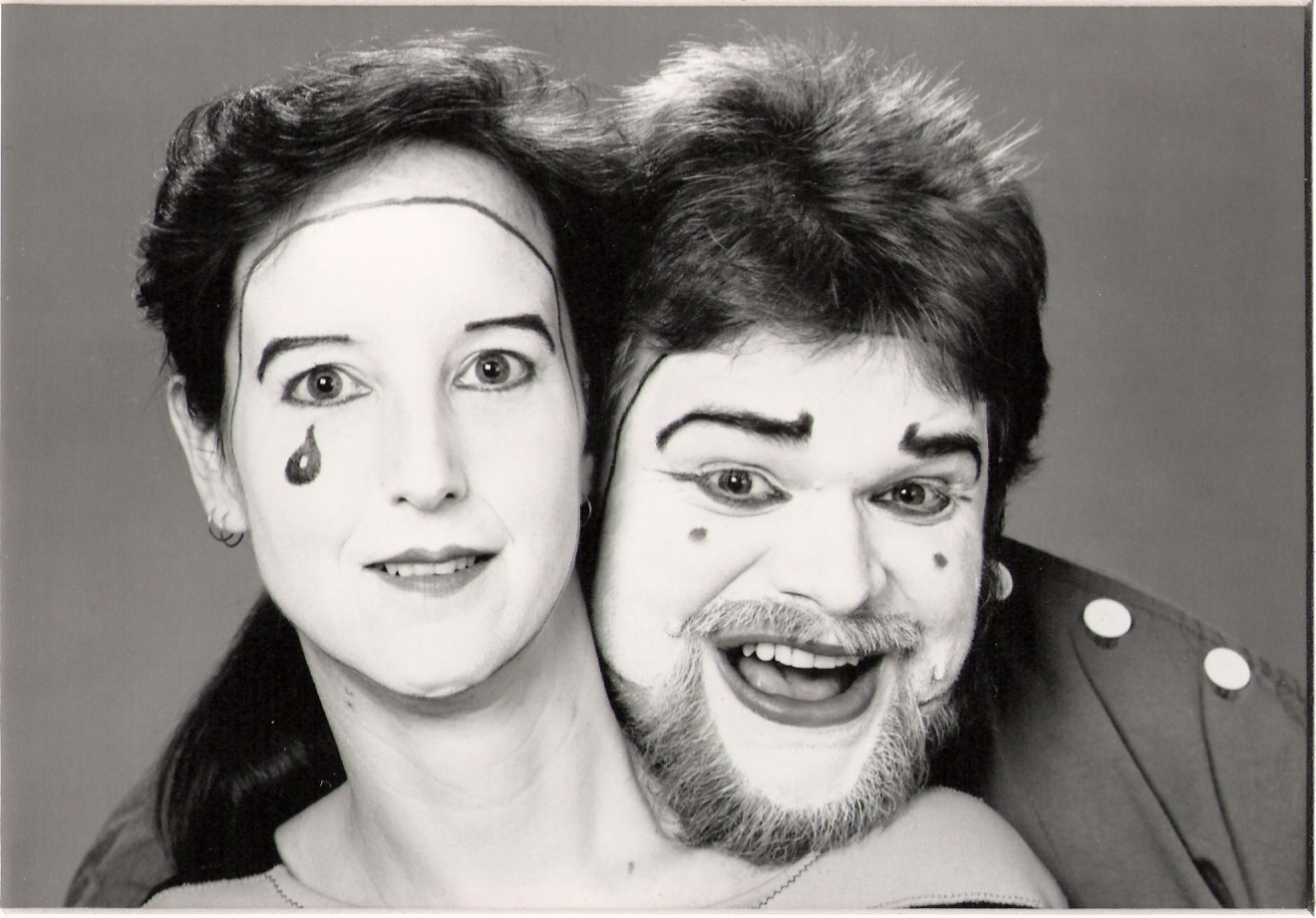
Promotional image from 1988

Canadian Deaf Theatre is Canada's only anglophone deaf professional theatre company. Its philosophy is "A belief in the interest and inherent natural ability of deaf people to act and entertain on a serious professional level and to offer something different from that of the hearing/speaking theatrical medium".

CDT was founded in 1989 by Lewis Hartland (born June 16, 1955), a former member of the Canadian Theatre of the Deaf. It is based in Cranbrook, British Columbia. Opening night for Varieties, the company's first production, was January 10, 1990. The first performances starred Hartland and hearing actress, Toni Miller, a native of Prince George, British Columbia, who was later replaced by Hartland's deaf wife, Constance Alice (née Harrison).

== Performance ==
Presented in mime, sign mime, pantomime, visual vernacular, theatrical clown, American Sign Language, ASL poetry and mime with masks, CDT's performances are designed to delight both deaf and hearing audiences. The company also offers workshops for children and adults on such topics as visual theatre techniques, storytelling, creative drama, the dynamics of communication and mime. The workshops for deaf children are designed to "enhance the student's power of perception, encourage their talents and skills in expressing themselves creatively, and increase their appreciation of the theatre."

== History ==
Founder and artistic director, Hartland was born in Nelson, British Columbia, and became deaf at the age of eight months from spinal meningitis. While a student at the Jericho Hill Provincial School for the Deaf in Vancouver, British Columbia. (1960–1972), he also took special instruction from a professional mime professor at Simon Fraser University in Burnaby, British Columbia (1970). He trained at the Canadian Mime Theatre School in 1977, took an actor's lab with Polish actor Ryszard Cieslak (1977), and presented solo mime performances as Lewis the Mime in Canada and the U.S. from 1977 to 1989. He was one of the founding members of the Canadian Theatre of the Deaf and performed with that company in 1976 and 1977. In 1977 Hartland founded the Deaf Mime Company of Toronto, and in 1982, he established the Ontario Theatre of the Deaf; both companies later disbanded. In 1988 and 1989, he studied and performed in the United States with the National Theatre of the Deaf in Chester, Connecticut. Enabled by the awarding of grants by the Canada Council for the Arts, Hartland also attended advanced studies with NTD. In the summer of 1989, he was one of the invited performers at The Deaf Way Conference and Festival in Washington, D.C. While there, he was approached by a representative of the Canadian Cultural Society of the Deaf, who encouraged him to form what became the Canadian Deaf Theatre. CDT was then founded in 1989 with the subsequent establishing of a board of directors in Cranbrook, British Columbia, in 1990. CDT received significant provincial and federal grants as well as private donations.

Connie Hartland (b. March 23, 1955) is a consummate performer in her own right. She was born hard of hearing in Burnaby, British Columbia, as a result of maternal rubella (she is now profoundly deaf), and attended several schools including Jericho Hill Provincial School (1960–1965), the Herbert Symonds Public School in Montreal, Quebec (1965–1966), the Ontario School for the Deaf, Milton (1966–1971 and 1973–1974), and the Ontario School for the Deaf in Belleville (1971–1973). Prior to joining her husband on stage, she travelled through Alaska presenting workshops in mime, and appeared on television in Toronto, Ontario, with her puppets.

At the beginning of each show, the couple's hearing son Samson Hartland (b. May 5, 1979) serves as interpreter while his father introduces the concept behind Canadian Deaf Theatre and explains something about their techniques.

== Present ==
In the summer of 1992, the Hartlands moved to Whitehorse, Yukon Territory, where they owned and operated a store called Last Frontier Sports Cards and Comics. Hartland hopes to move the CDT from Cranbrook, B.C. to Whitehorse one day and establish it in the Yukon with a new board of directors. He coaches acting on the side, and both he and his wife are active in the local Whitehorse Deaf community, advocating for such things as TDD access and special long-distance rates (50 percent discount) for deaf telephone users in the Yukon and Northwest Territories (a struggle in which they were assisted by federal New Democratic Party leader Audrey McLaughlin (Member of Parliament for Yukon Territory) and were successful in achieving). In 2003, they were also successful in lobbying the City of Whitehorse, Yukon to provide closed captioning of its publicly broadcast City Council meetings, making it the first municipality in Canada to offer such service.
