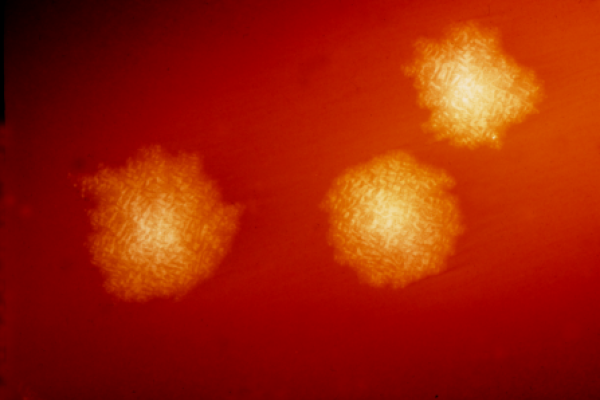
- C. difficile colonies on a blood agar plate
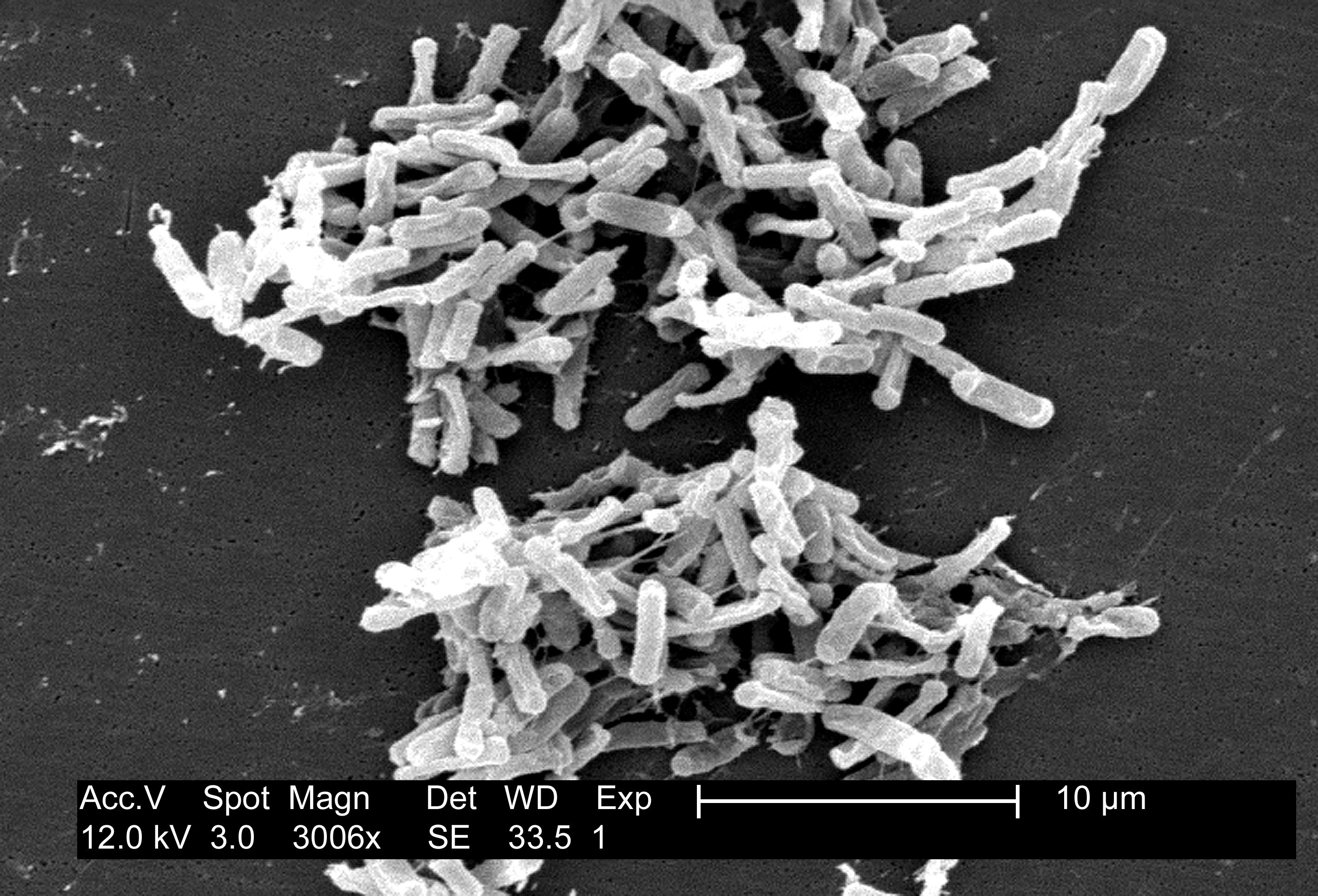
- Electron micrograph of the bacterium

Scientific classification
- Domain: Bacteria
- Kingdom: Bacillati
- Phylum: Bacillota
- Class: Clostridia
- Order: Peptostreptococcales
- Family: Peptostreptococcaceae
- Genus: Clostridioides
- Species: C. difficile

Binomial name
- Clostridioides difficile (Hall & O'Toole, 1935) Lawson & Rainey, 2016

Synonyms
- Bacillus difficilis Hall & O'Toole, 1935; Clostridium difficile (Hall & O'Toole, 1935) Prévot, 1938; Peptoclostridium difficile

= Clostridioides difficile =

Species of bacteria

Clostridioides difficile (syn. Clostridium difficile) is a bacterium known for causing serious diarrheal infections, and may also cause colon cancer. It is known also as C. difficile, or C. diff (/siː dɪf/), and is a Gram-positive species of spore-forming bacteria. Clostridioides spp. are anaerobic, motile bacteria, ubiquitous in nature and especially prevalent in soil. Its vegetative cells are rod-shaped, pleomorphic, and occur in pairs or short chains. Under the microscope, they appear as long, irregular (often drumstick- or spindle-shaped) cells with a bulge at their terminal ends (forms subterminal spores). C. difficile cells show optimum growth on blood agar at human body temperatures in the absence of oxygen. C. difficile is catalase- and superoxide dismutase-negative, and produces up to three types of toxins: enterotoxin A, cytotoxin B and Clostridioides difficile transferase. Under stress conditions, the bacteria produce spores that tolerate extreme conditions that the active bacteria cannot tolerate.

Clostridioides difficile is an important human pathogen; according to the CDC, in 2017 there were 223,900 cases in hospitalized patients and 12,800 deaths in the United States. Although C. difficile is known as a hospital- and antibiotic-associated pathogen, at most one third of infections can be traced to transmission from an infected person in hospitals, and only a small number of antibiotics are directly associated with an elevated risk of developing a C. difficile infection (CDI), namely clindamycin, fluoroquinolones and cephalosporins. Most infections are acquired outside of hospitals, and most antibiotics have similar elevated risk of infection on par with many non-antibiotic risk factors, such as using stool softeners and receiving an enema.

Clostridioides difficile can become established in the human colon without causing disease. Although early estimates indicated that C. difficile was present in 2–5% of the adult population, later research indicated that colonization is closely associated with a history of unrelated diarrheal illnesses, such as food poisoning or laxative abuse. Individuals with no history of gastrointestinal disturbances appear unlikely to become asymptomatic carriers. These carriers are thought to be a major infection reservoir.

== Taxonomy ==
The species was transferred from the genus Clostridium to Clostridioides in 2016, thus giving it the binomial Clostridioides difficile. This new name reflects the taxonomic differences between this species and members of the genus Clostridium, while maintaining the common name as C. difficile. As of 2025, no other species are in this new genus.

== Human pathogen ==
Pathogenic C. difficile strains produce multiple toxins. The best-characterized are enterotoxin (C. difficile toxin A) and cytotoxin (C. difficile toxin B), both of which may produce diarrhea and inflammation in infected patients (C. difficile colitis), although their relative contributions have been debated. The diarrhea may range from a few days of intestinal fluid loss to life-threatening pseudomembranous colitis, which is associated with intense colon inflammation and pseudomembrane formation on the intestinal mucosal surface. This may progress to toxic megacolon, a severe form of colonic distention that can put a patient at risk for colon perforation, sepsis and shock. Toxins A and B are glucosyltransferases that target and inactivate the Rho family of GTPases. Toxin B (cytotoxin) induces actin depolymerization by a mechanism correlated with a decrease in the ADP-ribosylation of the low molecular mass GTP-binding Rho proteins. A binary toxin (AB toxin), but its role in disease is not fully understood.

Additional virulence factors include an adhesion factor that mediates the binding to human colonic cells and a hyaluronidase. The bacterium also produces the chemical para-cresol, which inhibits the growth of other microbes in its vicinity and allows it to outcompete normal human gut flora.

The production of these toxins is not constitutive but is instead tightly controlled by metabolic and environmental signals. CodY is a global nutrient-sensing repressor that suppresses toxin gene expression when preferred amino acids such as proline, glycine, leucine, and valine are abundant. As these nutrients become limiting, CodY-mediated repression is relieved, permitting toxin production. CcpA links carbon availability to toxin regulation, with high glycolytic flux repressing tcdA and tcdB expression. The redox-sensing regulator Rex further connects the NADH/NAD⁺ ratio to virulence gene expression. Nitrosative stress generated by host immune cells in the form of reactive nitrogen species (RNS) represents an additional environmental signal shaping toxin production. The transcriptional regulator HcpR mediates C. difficile's defense against RNS, and disruption of this defense is associated with elevated TcdA and TcdB toxin production.

== Antibiotic resistance ==
Antibiotic treatment of C. difficile infections may be difficult, due both to antibiotic resistance and physiological factors of the bacterium (spore formation, protective effects of the pseudomembrane). A highly toxic strain of C. difficile, resistant to fluoroquinolone antibiotics, such as ciprofloxacin and levofloxacin, said to be causing geographically dispersed outbreaks in North America, was reported in 2005. In 2005 the US Centers for Disease Control in Atlanta warned of an epidemic strain with increased virulence, antibiotic resistance, or both. In 2018, resistance to other antibiotics such as metronidazole, the first choice of antimicrobial drug when treating CDI, was observed in up to 12% of clinical isolates. While treatment with various antibiotics continues, more diverse and stronger resistance will continue in C. difficile populations.

Clostridioides difficile spores resist many disinfectants, including high concentrations of bleach.

A recent study published by researchers in Nature Communications found that a chain mail-like armor, called "The S-layer" may be responsible for C. difficile's apparent immunity to antibiotic treatments, human saliva, as well as an enzyme that human host cells normally use to fight viruses.

The study also found that removing a region of the S-layer called D2 made C. diff cells susceptible to lysozyme, an enzyme typically found in saliva that tears open microbes' exteriors. Without the protection layer, the bacteria would also be vulnerable to the means of attacking the virus mentioned above.

== Persistence in the gut ==
Beyond spore formation and toxin secretion, an important virulence factor of Clostridioides difficile is its set of cell-surface proteins. These proteins are located on or beyond the bacterial peptidoglycan layer and include the surface (S-) layer, flagella, pili, and approximately 28 accessory cell-wall proteins (CWPs). Cell-surface proteins in C. difficile have been associated with several functions, including adhesion to host cells, biofilm formation, surface interactions, and motility.

The S-layer is the most abundant and functionally significant cell-surface component. Unlike in many other prokaryotes, the C. difficile S-layer is heterodimeric, consisting of low- and high-molecular-weight S-layer proteins. The S-layer contributes to maintaining cell-envelope stability and has been implicated in several virulence-related processes, including spore and toxin production, as well as resistance to antibiotics and environmental stress.

=== Research ===
Deletion of the slpA gene, which encodes the S-layer protein in Clostridioides difficile, results in marked changes and impairments in both cell and colony morphology. The mutant strain also exhibits reduced ability to withstand stress during the late stationary phase and shows approximately double the level of biofilm formation compared to the wild type. However, loss of the S-layer protein increases bacterial susceptibility to the antibiotic vancomycin and to environmental stress induced by Triton X-100. The absence of the S-layer further decreases sporulation efficiency, toxin release, and adherence capacity.

== Transmission ==
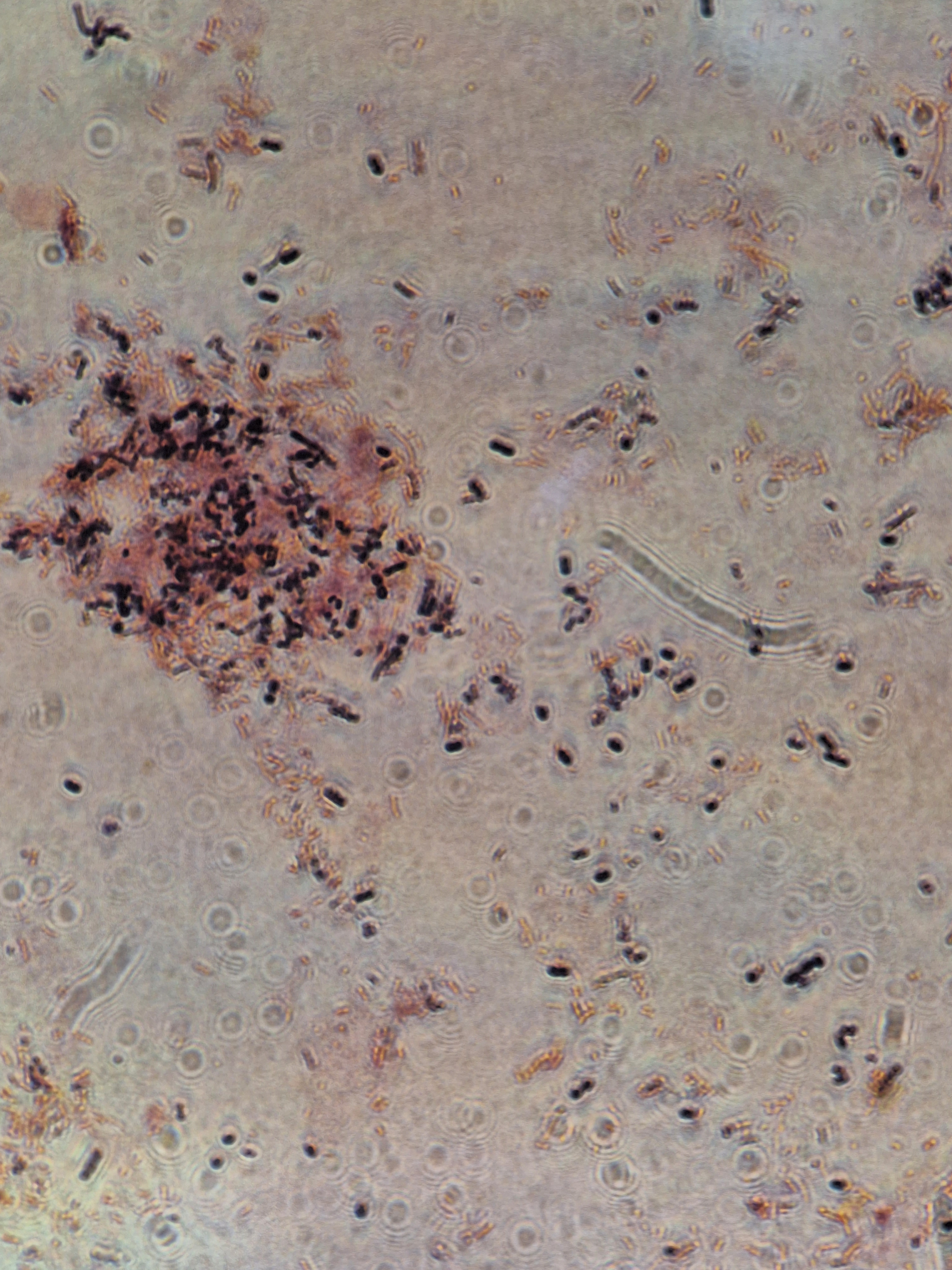
Gram-stained C. difficile amongst other microflora from infected patient fecal sample suspension.

Clostridioides difficile is transmitted from person or animal to person by the fecal-oral route, shed in faeces. The organism forms heat-resistant aero-tolerant spores that are resistant to alcohol-based hand cleansers or routine surface cleaning. Spores survive in clinical environments for long periods. Any surface, device, or material (e.g., toilets, bathing tubs, or rectal thermometers) that becomes contaminated with feces may serve as a reservoir for C. difficile spores, which can live for long periods of time on surfaces. Because of this, the bacterium may be cultured from almost any surface. Once spores are ingested, their acid resistance allows them to pass through the stomach unscathed. They germinate and multiply into vegetative cells in the colon upon exposure to bile acids. Consequently, the World Health Organization advocates the use of soap in addition to alcohol solutions to limit the spread of the spores. Sporulation was shown to be significantly reduced after inactivation of C. difficile's DNA methyltransferase CamA, raising the prospect of developing a drug that may inhibit this bacterium in a specific manner.

Susceptibility to colonization appears to be triggered by diarrheal illnesses, such as food poisoning, Crohn's disease or laxative abuse; people without a history of diarrheal illnesses who are exposed to C. difficile spores will not necessarily become carriers. Once people are colonized by C. difficile, they remain carriers for year-long time scales, but the day-to-day abundance of C. difficile fluctuates considerably – fluctuating from being below the limit of detection to high levels of shedding from one day to the next. GI disturbances in carriers appear to trigger periods of increased shedding which may be an important factor for transmission.

== Host range ==
Clostridioides difficile infects pigs, calves, and humans, and inhabits a natural reservoir of soil, faeces of domestic animals and humans, sewage, the human intestinal tract, and retail meat.

A 2015 CDC study estimated that C. difficile afflicted almost half a million Americans and caused 29,000 deaths in 2011. The study estimated that 40% of cases began in nursing homes or community health-care settings, while 24% occurred in hospitals.

Clostridioides difficile is common in the human digestive system. However, it is often outcompeted for nutrients by other bacteria, limiting its spread. If the sudden introduction of an antibiotic disrupts the microbiome, C. difficile may be able to grow as many of its competitors die. The incubation period is 5–10 days, with a range of 1 day to weeks following antibiotic treatment. Additionally, carriage of C. difficile with high levels of toxins is common in young children, while disease is rare. The production of one or even both toxins is not always sufficient for producing symptoms.

== Signs and symptoms ==
Symptoms of C. difficile infection include diarrhea (at least three loose bowel movements a day), dehydration, abdominal pain that can be severe, loss of appetite, and nausea.

== Pathophysiology ==
Clostridioides difficile is transmitted through the oral-fecal route, and many reproduce through spores. Spore germination depends on the ability to sense primary bile acids in the liver, like taurocholate, which are sensed by the germinant receptor CspC. Secondary bile acids can inhibit these processes in the colon. Spores can grow and colonize the intestine by antibiotic-induced shifts in the host microbiota. C. difficile secretes mucolytic enzymes like CWp84 to degrade the colonic mucosa. These spores can adhere to colon cells. Additionally, C. difficile is motile and can switch between motile and sessile phases, a process regulated by cyclic-di-GMP. C. difficile is also capable of forming biofilms and cell-to-cell signaling. C. difficile is often transferred via the hands of healthcare workers or the overall hospital environment and acquired by ingesting the pathogen. The spores resist the stomach acidity and germinate into their vegetative form in the small intestine. C. difficile can carry a broad spectrum of clinical manifestations, from asymptomatic to severe colitis and death. C. difficile is the most prevalent US healthcare infection, posing serious health risks and substantial care costs.

== Immune response ==
The C. difficile secreted toxins A (TcdA) and B (TcdB) contain immunogenic antigens that are recognised by antibodies and T cells. However, the levels of anti-TcdA and -TcdB IgG antibodies have not been able to discriminate healthy individuals from patients with C. difficile infection, meaning they have limited clinical use. Recent work has shown these toxins are also recognised by helper CD4+ T cells, predominantly by the T_{h}17 helper cells, which are important in maintaining a healthy gut environment, although in patients with severe infection these cells are impaired. Interestingly, individuals with severe C. difficile infection had significantly more toxin-specific T cells compared to those with mild infection, indicating T cells take part in fighting this infection. This immune response can further dysregulate microRNA expression. This is further evidenced by the recovery of the toxin-specific Th17 cells and microRNA expression following fecal microbiota transplant of patients with severe disease. New findings show that the loss of the interleukin-10 corresponds to higher levels of interleukin-22, which has been found to be important in a host's response to a C. difficile infection. Thus, IL-10 deficiency can increase a host's defense against the pathogen. This could be of particular interest in future research for treatments.

== Possible role in colon cancer ==
Studies indicate that C. difficile infection may contribute to colorectal cancer development through mechanisms such as chronic inflammation and epithelial barrier disruption. Toxigenic C. difficile strains isolated from human colon tumors have been shown to drive colonic tumorigenesis in mice, with tumor growth requiring the TcdB and accompanied by activation of Wnt/β-catenin signaling and inflammatory immune responses. C. difficile toxins can also induce cellular senescence; TcdB-triggered senescent cells may promote neoplastic transformation via the senescence-associated secretory phenotype. In addition, C. difficile releases membrane vesicles that directly stimulate epithelial–mesenchymal transition in colonic epithelial cells, as evidenced by upregulation of β-catenin and mesenchymal markers with loss of E-cadherin in both cell cultures and mouse models, thus creating a pro-tumorigenic microenvironment in the colon.

== Diagnosis ==
An infection with C. difficile is often indicated by foul-smelling diarrhea; an active or recent treatment with antibiotics can also point to Clostridium difficile associated diarrhea (CDAD). Clinical diagnosis, however, requires either the presence of the main toxins in the stool or direct cultivation of C. difficile . To confirm a CDI, a cytotoxin assay detects the cell's toxin B (ToxB) cytotoxicity in the fecal eluate. The presence of C. difficile toxin is confirmed by the anti-toxin antibodies' neutralization of the cytotoxic effect. C. difficile strains can also be cultured before conducting a cytotoxin assay. These cultures detect the C. difficile strain that can produce toxins. Enzyme immunoassays are more widely used due to their rapid turnaround, low cost, and simplicity, despite showing lower sensitivity than toxigenic stool cultures. PCR assays have a shorter turnaround time and a higher sensitivity range than the toxigenic stool culture, and their use helps avoid detection of asymptomatic patients.

== Treatment ==
Patients being treated with antibiotics when symptoms begin should stop taking them, if possible. This break in antibiotic therapy can sometimes lead to spontaneous resolution of symptoms. Patients who do not respond to the cessation of broad-spectrum antibiotics will need to be treated with antibiotics capable of killing C. difficile spores. Primary infections are typically treated with vancomycin, with a usual dosage of 125 mg every 6 hours. The vancomycin regimen has replaced the traditional use of metronidazole due to its greater efficacy, safety profile, and lower recurrence rates. In patients who cannot tolerate vancomycin, fidaxomicin is an acceptable option with similar efficacy and even lower recurrence rates than vancomycin. In cases of fulminant CDI, adjuvant therapy with parenteral metronidazole plus oral vancomycin or fidaxomicin is suggested.

Approximately 15-30% of patients who successfully complete therapy of primary infection with metronidazole or vancomycin will experience a relapse. About 40% of these patients will continue to have recurrent C. difficile infection. The first relapse of C. difficile is usually treated with the same antibiotic used to treat the primary infection. Any subsequent infections should not be treated with metronidazole. Occasionally, a standard 10-day course of oral vancomycin will not work. In these cases, a vancomycin taper is the preferred treatment. Patients take decreasing doses of vancomycin over a period of up to 3 months, depending on the severity of the infection.

Each subsequent relapse of C. difficile tends to be more severe than previous infections. Long-term treatment with a vancomycin taper supplemented with probiotics, especially Saccharomyces boulardii, is associated with a higher rate of success.

After three relapses, patients may be treated with oral fidaxomicin, a narrow-spectrum antibiotic. The usual dosage is 200 mg twice a day orally for 10 days. Fidaxomicin is considered to be superior to vancomycin for severe CDI. The major downside of treatment with fidaxomicin is the cost of medication. A 10-day course may cost up to US$3,500. When a patient is deteriorating or progressing to severe-complicated disease the addition of intravenous tigecycline merits considerations. Patients with high risk of relapse may also benefit from the addition of the monoclonal antibody bezlotoxumab to the standard of care.

Patients who do not respond to traditional antibiotic therapy may be eligible for a fecal microbiota transplant (FMT). Healthcare providers can transfer stool from a healthy person to the colon of a patient with recurrent CDI. This process is the most successful treatment for severe CDI with a cure rate around 93%. Fecal matter transplants have also been found to be an effective and safe treatment option for children and young adults. Recurrence rates of CDI in patients treated with a FMT are generally low, around 19%, which makes it very effective at treating chronic CDI cases. However, in some cases, flares of inflammatory bowel disease are a possible side effect of the treatment. The state of the host immune system is important when considering the success of microbiota-based treatments in clearing infection. Long-term effects of FMT are unknown, as the procedure has only been FDA-approved for recurrent CDI since 2013 and relatively few procedures have been performed. If transplantation is not an option, removal of the infected part of the colon can cure CDI.

In April 2023, the FDA approved the first oral microbiome therapeutic, VOWST for treatment of recurrent CDI.

The prediction of C. difficile recurrence has been of great interest, but there has been no consensus on significantly associated risk factors.

Further, with the increase in study around genome-scale metabolic modeling, there have been several diseases for which new treatments are identified or hypothesized by studying essential genes to a microorganism's metabolic pathways. C. difficile is no different in that novel treatments may be discovered by modeling and knocking out genes to analyze essentiality. For example, a pre-made genome-scale metabolic model of C. difficile strain 630, a virulent, multi-drug resistant strain, can be accessed through BiGG Models (specifically model iCN900) and utilized to perform a gene knock-out essentiality analysis. This analysis involves removing each gene in the model once, then optimizing the growth of the model to obtain a growth rate. Any gene whose removal causes <1% of the growth of the organism with the gene present is labeled as essential. After performing this analysis, a list of 70 essential genes (out of 900) is obtained. These genes can then be cross-referenced with DrugBank to determine what compounds target the proteins those genes encode for. As a specific example, one such essential gene is CD630_00470, which encodes for the protein 2-C-methyl-D-erythritol 4-phosphate cytidylyltransferase. By utilizing DrugBank to search for compounds that target this protein, several compounds can be found, one of which is cadaverine. Cadaverine is a known product of a healthy human gut microbiome, which is in line with C. difficile prevalence among disrupted gut microbiomes, and has been noted to reduce aggression in certain breast cancers. The effect of cadaverine on C. difficile is not known: if it inhibits 2-C-methyl-D-erythritol 4-phosphate cytidylyltransferase, it could show promise as a novel therapeutic for C. difficile infections.

== Prevention ==
C. difficile infection is spread through the fecal-oral route through ingestion and acid-resistant spores. Appropriate hand hygiene of healthcare workers is vital to remove spores, which includes thoroughly washing one's hands with soap and warm water. Additionally, isolation of patients with acute diarrhea can prevent the spread of spores within the hospital. Another way to prevent CDIs is wearing personal protective equipment when interacting with C. difficile patients. Furthermore, CDI transmission can be prevented by daily environmental sporicidal disinfection in patient rooms. Also, reducing the length of antibiotic therapy decreases the CDI rates in hospitals.

Alcohol-based hand rubs do not effectively remove Clostridioides difficile spores from hands; only mechanical washing with soap and water has been shown to eliminate them.

== Strains ==
In 2005, molecular analysis led to the identification of the C. difficile strain type characterized as group BI by restriction endonuclease analysis, as North American pulse-field-type NAP1 by pulsed-field gel electrophoresis and as ribotype 027; the differing terminology reflects the predominant techniques used for epidemiological typing. This strain is referred to as C. difficile BI/NAP1/027.

As of 2016, the NAP1 strain has been replaced by novel strains in some areas of British Columbia. These novel strains include NAP2 and NAP4, and some strains that do not have a NAP designation. The frequency of these novel strains increased from 2008 to 2013 in one studied region, displacing the originally more common and recognizable NAP1 bacteria.

Two strains, ribotypes RT078 and RT027, can live on low concentrations of the sugar trehalose; both strains became more common after trehalose was introduced as a food additive in the early 2000s, thus increasing dietary trehalose intake.

== Genome ==
Genomic information
- NCBI ID: 1496
- Ploidy: haploid
- Genome size: 4.3 Mb
- Number of chromosomes: 1
- Year of completion: 2005

The first complete genome sequence of a C. difficile strain was published in 2005 by the Sanger Institute in the UK. This was of strain 630, a virulent and multiple drug-resistant strain isolated in Switzerland in 1982. By 2010 scientists at the Sanger Institute had sequenced genomes of about 30 C. difficile isolates using next-generation sequencing technologies from 454 Life Sciences and Illumina.

Researchers at McGill University in Montreal sequenced the genome of the highly virulent Quebec strain of C. difficile in 2005 using ultra-high throughput sequencing technology. The tests involved doing 400,000 DNA parallel-sequencing reactions of the bacterium's genome, which had been fragmented for sequencing. These sequences were assembled computationally to form a complete genome sequence.

In 2012, scientists at University of Oxford sequenced C. difficile genomes from 486 cases arising over four years in Oxfordshire using next-generation sequencing technologies from Illumina.

== Epigenome ==
Clostridioides difficile has a highly diverse epigenome, with 17 high-quality methylation motifs reported so far, the majority pertaining to the 6mA type. Methylation at one of these motifs - CAAAAA, was shown to impact sporulation, a key step in C. difficile disease transmission, as well as cell length, biofilm formation, and host colonization.

== Bacteriophage ==
At least eight mainly temperate bacteriophages have been isolated from C. difficile, ranging in genome size from about 30 to about 60 kbp. Both environmentally and clinically derived C. difficile strains carry a diverse and prevalent set of prophages.
