= Democratic Confederation of Labour (DRC) =

National trade union centre in the Democratic Republic of the Congo

CDT
- Democratic Confederation of Labour
- Confédération Démocratique du Travail
- Headquarters: Kinshasa, DRC
- Location: Democratic Republic of the Congo
- Affiliations: ITUC

The Democratic Confederation of Labour (CDT) is the third largest national trade union centre in the Democratic Republic of the Congo. It is affiliated with the International Trade Union Confederation.
