= Clostridioides difficile toxin A =

Cytotoxin produced by Clostridioides difficile

Identifiers
- Organism: Clostridioides difficile
- Symbol: toxA
- Alt. symbols: tcdA
- Entrez: 4914076
- RefSeq (Prot): YP_001087137.1
- UniProt: P16154

Other data
- EC number: 2.4.1.-
- Chromosome: genome: 0.79 - 0.81 Mb
Search for
- Structures: Swiss-model
- Domains: InterPro

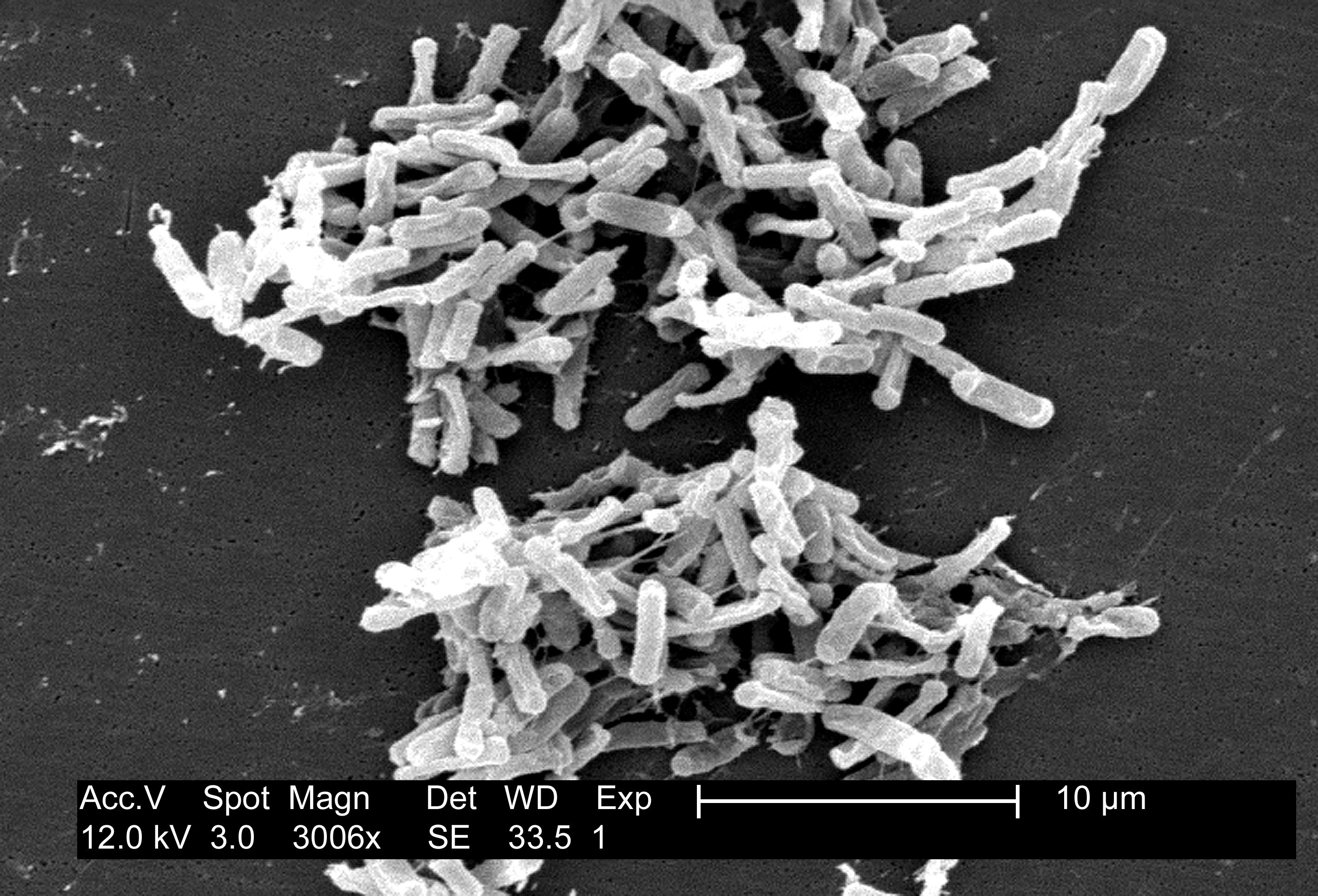
SEM of Clostridioides difficile bacteria

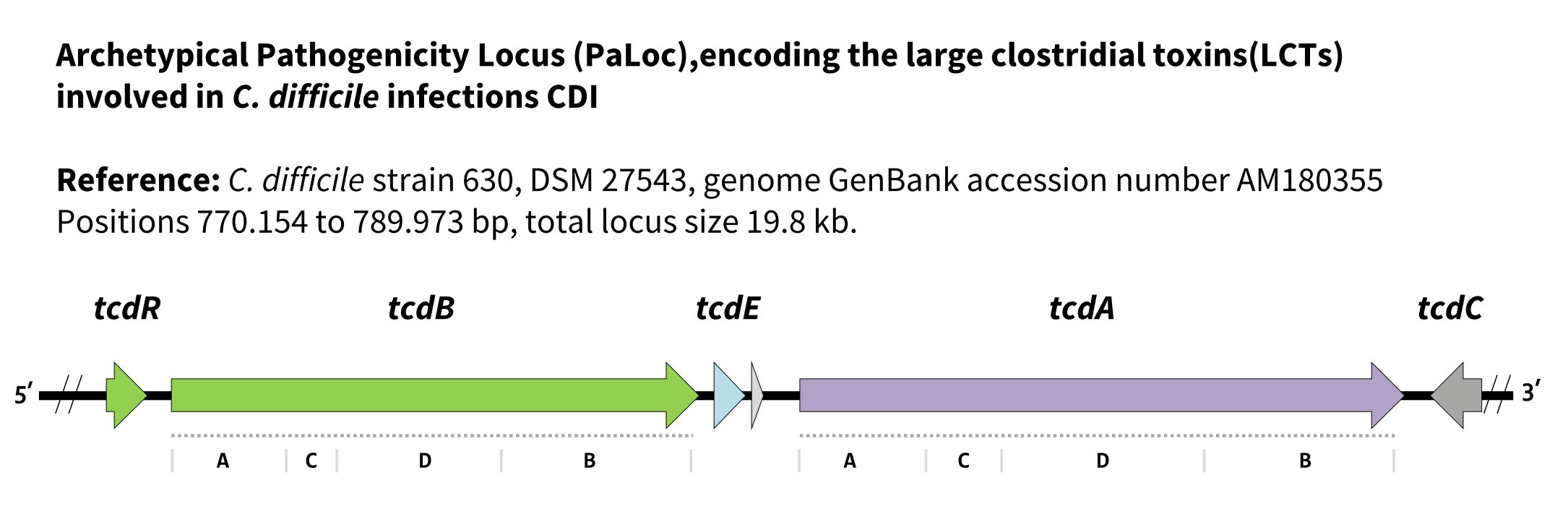
PaLoc Reference: Clostridioides difficile strain 630, DSM 27543, genome GenBank accession number AM180355 Positions 770.154 to 789.973 bp, total locus size 19.8 kb.

Clostridioides difficile toxin A (TcdA) is a toxin produced by the bacteria Clostridioides difficile, formerly known as Clostridium difficile. It is similar to Clostridioides difficile Toxin B. The toxins are the main virulence factors produced by the gram positive, anaerobic, Clostridioides difficile bacteria. The toxins function by damaging the intestinal mucosa and cause the symptoms of C. difficile infection, including pseudomembranous colitis.

TcdA is one of the largest bacterial toxins known. With a molecular mass of 308 kDa, it is usually described as a potent enterotoxin, but it also has some activity as a cytotoxin. The toxin acts by modifying host cell GTPase proteins by glucosylation, leading to changes in cellular activities. Risk factors for C. difficile infection include antibiotic treatment, which can disrupt normal intestinal microbiota and lead to colonization of C. difficile bacteria.

== tcdA gene ==
The gene contains an open reading frame (ORF) of 8,133 nucleotides, coding for 2,710 amino acids. TcdA and TcdB share 63% homology in their amino acid sequences. These genes are expressed during late log phase and stationary phase in response to environmental factors. Environmental stresses such as antibiotics and catabolite repression can influence toxin expression.

== Pathogenicity locus ==
The tcdA and tcdB genes are situated on the Clostridioides difficile chromosome in a 19.6-kb pathogenicity locus (PaLoc) found only in toxigenic strains of C. difficile. Non toxigenic strains contain a 127 base pair fragment replacing the PaLoc. This locus also contains three other accessory genes tcdC, tcdR, and tcdE. TcdC expression is high during early exponential phase and declines as growth moves into stationary phase, consistent with increases in tcdA and tcdB expression. Accordingly, expression patterns have indicated tcdC as a possible negative regulator of toxin production. tcdR may serve as a positive regulator of toxin production. tcdE has been speculated to facilitate release of TcdA and TcdB through lytic activity on the bacterial cell membrane. Due to its homology with other proteins of similar function, as well as the location of the gene between tcdA and tcdB, tcdE is predicted to function as the lytic protein that facilitates release since TcdA and TcdB lack a signal peptide for secretion.

== Structure ==
The protein contains three domains. The amino N-terminal domain contains the active site, responsible for the glucosylating activity of the toxin. Both TcdA and TcdB use this highly conserved N-terminal region (74% homology between both toxins) to alter identical substrates.

The carboxy C-terminal domain contains repeating units that are responsible for receptor binding on target cell surfaces. These short homologous repeating units have been termed combined repetitive oligopeptide (CROPs). A recent study demonstrates that the CROPs determine the potency of TcdA through interactions with structures on the cell surface. These CROP regions range from 21-50 residues and play a role in receptor binding. This C-terminal repetitive region is designated as the immuno-dominant region since ligand binding can be blocked by monoclonal antibodies specific to this region. This region contains the most hydrophilic portion of the molecule.

A centrally located hydrophobic domain containing a cluster of 172 highly conserved hydrophobic amino acids is thought to be important for translocation of the enzymatic portion of the protein.

== Mechanism of action ==
TcdA must be internalized into the host cell via endocytosis in order to access the cytosol. Receptor binding is the first step required for entry into the cell via endocytosis in an acidic endosome. Low pH in the endosome induces structural changes such as exposure of the hydrophobic domains that are crucial for TcdA function.

The N-terminal domain of TcdA functions to catalyze a glucotransferase reaction, which transfers a glucose molecule from UDP-Glucose and covalently attaches it to conserved amino acids in target molecules. Therefore, TcdA catalyzes glucosylation and the subsequent irreversible inactivation of target molecules in the Ras family of small GTPases. These target molecules include RhoA, Rac, and Cdc42, which are regulatory proteins of the eukaryotic actin cytoskeleton and modulators of many various cell signaling pathways.

== Intracellular targets ==
TcdA primarily targets Rho, Rac, and Cdc42. These molecules are important regulators of cell signaling. Small GTPases such as Rho, Rac, and Cdc42 regulate their activity by alternating between an active GTP-bound state, and an inactive GDP-bound state. Guanine exchange factors (GEFs) regulate the exchange of GTP and GDP.

TcdA glucosylates RhoA by transferring a glucose molecule from UDP-glucose, a nucleotide sugar, to Thr-37 of the RhoA GTPase. In Rac and Cdc42, the sugar moiety is transferred to the Thr-35. The glucosylation prevents proper binding of GTP and blocks activation. TcdA acts preferentially on the GDP-bound form of the GTPase proteins since this configuration exposes the threonine residue that is glucosylated by the toxin.

RhoA regulates the actin cytoskeleton and forms stress fibers and focal adhesions. When RhoA is inactivated via TcdA, its interaction with downstream effectors is inhibited. This leads to changes in the actin cytoskeleton that increase permeability of the intestinal epithelium. Rac and Cdc42 are involved in filopodium formation crucial for movement and cell migration. Overall, Rho, Rac, and Cdc42 all regulate processes in cells that are dependent on actin polymerization. Many of the physiologic effects that cells experience after exposure to TcdA can be linked to disregulation of actin polymerization and cellular pathways controlled by TcdA targets.

== Physiologic effects ==
=== Cell morphology ===
Exposure to TcdA leads to immediate changes in cell morphology, including loss of structural integrity due to a decrease in filamentous actin (F-actin), and an increase in globular actin. Disorganization of actin filaments and the cytoskeleton leads to increased permeability of tight junctions resulting in severe epithelial cell damage and fluid secretion. Fluid accumulation and secretion are secondary to mucosal damage that occurs after exposure to TcdA. Distinct changes in the microfilament system lead to cell rounding and cell death. These changes result from the inactivation of Rho proteins, which play an important role in regulating tight junctions.

=== Apoptosis ===
Apoptosis is the most likely mechanism accounting for death of cells exposed to TcdA. Rho inactivation can activate caspase-3 and caspase-9; two key components of the apoptotic pathway. TcdA has been linked to mitochondrial membrane disruption and release of cytochrome C through caspase activation and Rho inactivation, further suggesting that TcdA is capable of inducing apoptosis.

== Clinical significance ==
=== Clostridioides difficile associated diarrhea (CDAD) ===
Animal models have shown TcdA includes diarrhea, neutrophil infiltration, inflammation of intestinal mucosa, and necrosis of epithelial cells. This toxin is considered the main cause of CDAD. TcdA damages intestinal villous tips, which disrupts the brush border membrane, leading to cell erosion and fluid leakage from the damaged area. This damage and associated fluid response causes the diarrhea associated with Clostridioides difficile infection.

=== Pseudomembranous colitis ===
TcdA can induce the physiological changes that occur in C. difficile related pseudomembranous colitis (PMC), a severe ulceration of the colon. Toxin damage to the colonic mucosa promotes accumulations of fibrin, mucin, and dead cells to form a layer of debris in the colon (pseudomembrane), causing an inflammatory response. TcdA damage causes increased epithelial permeability, cytokine and chemokine production, neutrophil infiltration, production of reactive oxygen species (ROS), mast cell activation, and direct damage to the intestinal mucosa. All can be attributed to TcdA-induced inactivation of Rho GTPase proteins. Loss of tight junctions can provide entry for neutrophils into the intestines, leading to neutrophil accumulation; a hallmark of PMC. TcdA-induced cytokine production of IL-8 and other inflammatory mediators contributes to the stages of inflammation seen in PMC. Infiltration by neutrophils, macrophages, and mast cells in response to TcdA damage increases the inflammatory response through production and release of other mediators such as tumor necrosis factor alpha, IL-1, IL-6, and other monokines. These mediators cause additional damage to intestinal mucosa and further increase the inflammatory response, influencing PMC persistence. If extensive damage to the intestinal wall occurs, bacteria can enter the bloodstream and cause septic shock and death.

== Toxin detection and diagnosis ==
TcdA and TcdB are present in supernatant fluids of C. difficile cultures and can be purified from filtrates. Both toxins are consistently detected in fecal samples from humans and animals and are now used as markers to diagnose C. difficile infection. Over 90% of patients infected with C. difficile were found to have cytotoxic activity in their stool. Glucosylation of Rho GTPases inactivates the GTPase proteins, leading to collapse of the cytoskeleton, resulting in cell rounding. A tissue culture assay has been developed to detect C. difficile toxins in stool samples. A cell rounding assay (cytotoxicity assay) has been developed to diagnose C. difficile infection. Enzyme-linked immunosorbent assays (ELISAs) have been used to detect TcdA and TcdB with specific antibodies. When used with an ELISA, the cytotoxicity assay is the "gold standard" when used on Vero cells for C. difficile diagnosis.

== Importance of TcdA and TcdB in C. difficile infection ==
Since the 1980s and early 1990s, the roles of TcdA and TcdB in C. difficile infection have been much debated. Previous reports with purified toxins indicated that TcdA alone was enough to cause symptoms of infection and TcdB was unable to do so unless combined with TcdA. A more recent experiment indicated that TcdB was, in fact, essential for virulence. Earlier research established TcdA strictly as an enterotoxin, and TcdB as a cytotoxin, but later both toxins were found to have the same mechanism of action. To fully investigate the role of both toxins in pathogenesis of C. difficile infection, a gene knockout system in a hamster infection model was developed. By permanently knocking out tcdA, tcdB, or both (double knockout), it was shown that C. difficile producing one or both toxins was capable of cytotoxic activity, and this activity translated directly to virulence in vivo. It was also found that a double tcdAtcdB knockout was completely attenuated in virulence. Overall, this research has demonstrated the importance of both TcdA and TcdB in C. difficile infection, showing that either toxin is capable of cytotoxicity.

== See also ==
- C. difficile TcdE Holin
- Holin
