= Glucosyltransferase =

Class of enzymes

Glucosyltransferases are a type of glycosyltransferase that enable the transfer of glucose.

Examples include:

- glycogen synthase
- glycogen phosphorylase

They are categorized under EC number 2.4.1.
