= Michael J. Sadowsky =

American microbiologist

- Education: University of Wisconsin; University of Hawaii
- Occupations: Director, BioTechnology Institute; Distinguished McKnight Professor, University of Minnesota
- Known for: E. coli source identification Fecal microbiota transplant
- Awards: Young Investigator Award, American Society for Microbiology (1990); Fellow, American Association for the Advancement of Science (2008)
- Website: www.swac.umn.edu/directory/faculty/michael-sadowsky

Michael J. Sadowsky is an American microbiologist at the University of Minnesota. He is the director of the BioTechnology Institute and a Professor in the Department of Soil, Water, and Climate. Sadowsky's scientific career spans over 40 years, most of it focused on research studying the nature of bacteria and bacterial genes in ecological settings, with a particular emphasis on soil bacteria that are involved in nitrogen fixation.

== Early life and education ==
Sadowsky was born to Nathan and Judith Sadowsky. He attended the University of Wisconsin- Madison for his undergraduate studies, earning a Bachelor's degree in Bacteriology and later attending the University of Wisconsin Oshkosh for his Master's degree in Microbiology. For his Ph.D, Sadowsky attended the University of Hawaii, completing his PhD dissertation titled, "Physiological, serological, and plasmid characterization of fast-growing rhizobia that nodulate soybeans" in the laboratory of B. Ben Bohlool. Sadowsky performed his postdoctoral research at McGill University, where he met his wife Suzanne.

== Scientific career ==
Sadowsky developed an analysis technique to distinguish between animal and human E. coli in waterways, work that was ultimately featured in Time (magazine). He also studied the mechanisms underlying the resolution of recurrent C. difficile infection treated with fecal microbiota transplant; the development of standardized protocols for preparing frozen samples for fecal microbiota transplant; and a novel symbiosis mechanism between soil bacteria and legumes. He also holds 10 patents for technology related to his research, and was the editor of the textbook The Fecal Bacteria. As of June 2020 he has authored or co-authored over 600 scientific publications, which have been cited over 25,000 times and with a h-index of 80.

== Awards and honors ==
List of awards:

- 2009 College of Food, Agricultural and Natural Resource Sciences Distinguished Graduate Teaching Award
- 2008 College of Food, Agricultural and Natural Resource Sciences Distinguished Diversity and Inclusion Award
- 2008 Fellow, American Association for the Advancement of Science
- 2006 Time (magazine) Innovator
- 2004 Distinguished McKnight Professorship
- 1999 Fellow, American Academy of Microbiology
- 1991-1992 Bush Foundation Excellence in Teaching Program
- 1990 Young Investigator Award, American Society for Microbiology
