= Stefan D. Holubar =

American colorectal surgeon and academic

- Education: University of Vermont (MD); Mayo Clinic Graduate School (MS)
- Occupations: Colorectal surgeon; Academic
- Known for: Surgery for inflammatory bowel disease; description of "twisted pouch syndrome"; founder of Pouchology.org
- Title: Professor of Surgery
- Scientific career
- Fields: Colon and rectal surgery
- Workplaces: Cleveland Clinic (2017–present); Dartmouth–Hitchcock Medical Center (2010–2017)

Stefan D. Holubar is an American colorectal surgeon and academic. He is Professor of Surgery in the Department of Colon and Rectal Surgery at the Cleveland Clinic in Cleveland, Ohio, where his clinical and research work focuses on the surgical treatment of inflammatory bowel disease (IBD), including Crohn's disease and ulcerative colitis.

== Early life and education ==
Holubar received his Doctor of Medicine from the University of Vermont in 2002. He completed a general surgery residency at North Shore–Long Island Jewish Health System in 2007, followed by a research fellowship, a Master of Science in clinical and translational science, and a colon and rectal surgery fellowship at the Mayo Clinic in Rochester, Minnesota.

== Career ==
After completing his training, Holubar joined Dartmouth–Hitchcock Medical Center, where he became Chief of the Division of Colon and Rectal Surgery. In 2017 he joined the Department of Colon and Rectal Surgery at the Cleveland Clinic, where he has served as IBD Surgery Section Chief and Director of Research and is the institution's American College of Surgeons National Surgical Quality Improvement Program (NSQIP) surgeon champion. He was appointed Professor of Surgery at the Cleveland Clinic Lerner College of Medicine and Case Western Reserve University in 2025.

Holubar has held national leadership roles in his field, including Chair of the American Society of Colon and Rectal Surgeons (ASCRS) IBD Committee (2023–2025) and co-leadership of the ACS NSQIP IBD Collaborative. He is a co-principal investigator of the Crohn's & Colitis Foundation's longitudinal surgical cohort, IBD-SIRQC (Surgical Innovation, Research, and Quality Collaborative). Internationally, he is a member of the European Crohn's and Colitis Organisation (ECCO) and has contributed to its clinical practice guidelines.

== Research ==
Holubar's research concerns surgical outcomes in inflammatory bowel disease, surgical quality improvement, and the application of data science and artificial intelligence to colorectal surgery. He described "twisted pouch syndrome", a mechanical complication of the ileal pouch in which the pouch twists around its mesenteric axis; the condition was subsequently the subject of a narrative review in the journal Inflammatory Bowel Diseases. He has also worked on three-dimensional pouchography as an imaging tool to aid the diagnosis of pouch dysfunction. He founded the iPouch Consortium and developed Pouchology.org, a searchable interface to the published literature on ileal pouch surgery.

According to Google Scholar, Holubar's publications have been cited more than 11,000 times and he has an h-index of 50. He has authored more than 200 peer-reviewed articles, the majority concerning inflammatory bowel disease, and has contributed chapters to The ASCRS Textbook of Colon and Rectal Surgery. His most highly cited works include the ECCO clinical practice guidelines on the medical and surgical treatment of ulcerative colitis and Crohn's disease. He has also served as a guest editor of the journal Clinics in Colon and Rectal Surgery.

== Personal life ==
Holubar is a colorectal cancer survivor. Diagnosed with inflammatory bowel disease as a child, he was found to have colon cancer during medical school after a colonoscopy, and underwent surgery; the experience influenced his decision to specialize in colorectal surgery. He speaks publicly about colorectal cancer screening and the patient perspective in inflammatory bowel disease.

== Selected publications ==
- "ECCO Guidelines on Therapeutics in Crohn's Disease: Surgical Treatment". Journal of Crohn's and Colitis. 2024.
- "ECCO Guidelines on Therapeutics in Ulcerative Colitis: Medical Treatment". Journal of Crohn's and Colitis. 2022.

== Selected awards ==
- American Society of Colon and Rectal Surgeons (ASCRS) / Michigan Society of Colon and Rectal Surgeons Award (2022)
