= Margaret D. Lowman =

American biologist and ecologist (born 1953)

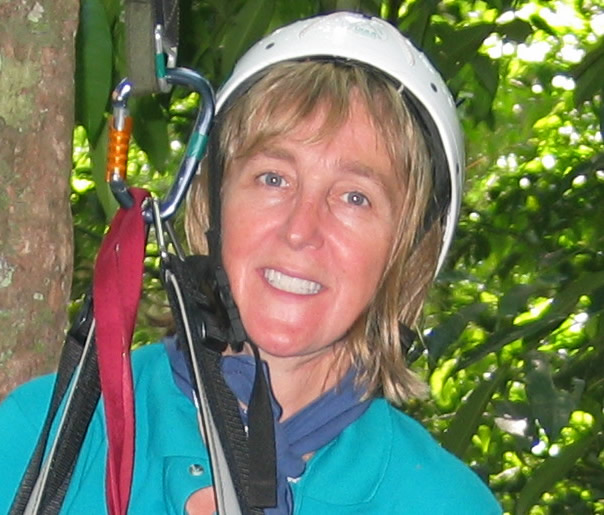
- Lowman climbing a tree
- Born: Margaret Dalzell Lowman; December 23, 1953 (age 72); Elmira, New York, U.S.
- Education: Williams College (B.A.); University of Aberdeen (Scotland) M.Sc. University of Sydney (Australia) (Ph.D.); Tuck School of Business (Dartmouth) Executive Management
- Known for: Pioneer of forest canopy research Builder of canopy walkways Role model for women in science
- Children: Edward and James
- Awards: Kilby Laureate; Mendel Medal for Science and Spirit; Williams College Bicentennial Medal; Garden Club of America Award for Achievements in Conservation Education
- Scientific career
- Fields: Conservation biology, canopy ecology, botany, women and minorities in science
- Workplaces: California Academy of Sciences; Nature Research Center (NRC); North Carolina State University; Selby Botanical Gardens; National University of Singapore; University of Oxford (UK); New College of Florida

Margaret D. Lowman, Ph.D. a.k.a. Canopy Meg (born December 23, 1953) is an American biologist, educator, ecologist, writer, explorer, and public speaker. Her expertise involves canopy ecology, canopy plant-insect relationships, and constructing canopy walkways.

Nicknamed the "real-life Lorax" and "Einstein of the treetops", Lowman pioneered the science of canopy ecology. She is known as the "mother of canopy research." For more than 45 years, she has designed hot-air balloons and walkways for treetop exploration across 45+ countries to solve mysteries in the world's forests, especially insect pests and ecosystem health. She works to map the canopy for biodiversity and to champion forest conservation around the world.

Lowman's academic training includes Williams College (BA, Biology) in 1976; Aberdeen University (MSc, Ecology) in 1978; Sydney University (Ph.D., Botany); and Tuck School of Business (Executive Management).

== Research ==
Lowman has authored more than 200 peer-reviewed scientific publications and 12 books, including Tree Day: A Story of 24 Hours and 24 Arboreal Lives (August 2025), CanopyMeg Chronicles (December 2024), The Arbornaut (2021), It's a Jungle Up There (2006), and Life in the Treetops (1999). From 1978 to 1989, Lowman lived in Australia and worked on canopy research in rain forests and dry forests. She was instrumental in determining the cause of Eucalypt Dieback Syndrome in Australia and worked with forest conservation and regeneration. She taught at Williams College in Massachusetts, pioneering many aspects of forest canopy research. During her time there, she spearheaded the construction of the first canopy walkway in North America.

== Work ==
Lowman currently serves as the CEO of the TREE Foundation, a global non-profit organization dedicated to tree research, education, exploration, and conservation. She leads the foundation's flagship initiative, Mission Green (official site), which aims to build canopy walkways in biodiversity hotspots across the globe to protect forests and promote environmental education. Through the TREE Foundation, Lowman also develops programs to connect underserved youth with STEM opportunities, empowering the next generation of conservation scientists.

Lowman previously served as Chief of Science & Sustainability at the California Academy of Sciences, where she oversaw the institution's scientific research and exploration programs, as well as its sustainability initiatives addressing the challenges of sustaining life on Earth. As the academy's inaugural Chief of Science and Sustainability, Lowman helped lead a twenty-first-century strategy that integrated scientific research with both local and global sustainability efforts. She also restructured internal operations to prioritize impactful science, sustainability, collections management, and fiscal responsibility.

Before joining the academy, Lowman was a research professor at North Carolina State University and founding director of North Carolina's innovative Nature Research Center at the North Carolina Museum of Natural Sciences. She oversaw the creation, construction, staffing, and programming of this research wing in collaboration with the NC University system. She was later promoted to Senior Scientist and Director of Academic Partnerships & Global Initiatives for the entire museum, serving as the primary advocate for the NRC and its educational mission.

Lowman has served as Vice President of the Ecological Society of America; Treasurer of the Association for Tropical Biology and Conservation; executive director of the TREE Foundation; member of the board of directors for The Explorers Club and Earthwatch; and Climate Change Adviser to Alex Sink, former CFO of the Florida Cabinet. She also previously served as Director of Environmental Initiatives at New College of Florida, CEO of Marie Selby Botanical Gardens, and Professor of Biology and Environmental Studies at Williams College.

Lowman promotes conservation through education, a central theme of her book It’s a Jungle Up There. She has contributed to multiple JASON Project educational programs and other science outreach initiatives. Her writing often blends canopy ecology with reflections on navigating a male-dominated field and raising children as a single parent. Her sons co-authored It’s a Jungle Up There, offering insights into how their family not only managed but thrived alongside her career. Her younger son, James Burgess, later co-founded OpenBiome.

== Organizations ==
In 1999 Lowman became the executive director of Marie Selby Botanical Gardens in Sarasota, Florida where she helped raise donations over 100 percent and increased membership by "friend-raising". The Selby Garden's lecture series "Tuesdays In The Tropics" was well attended by the community with topics such as "Does Money Grow on Trees? Challenges of Rain Forest Conservation". During her tenure, the Gardens' budget shifted into the black from previous years and the membership more than doubled. When the board shifted away from a botanical and conservation-oriented mission, Lowman accepted an offer at New College of Florida as Professor of Biology and Environmental Studies. The Center for Canopy Ecology relocated from Selby Gardens to New College following Lowman.

Lowman co-founded the TREE Foundation, along with Sarasota non-profit accountant Mike Pender and community leader, Bob Richardson. She still serves as its executive director, and the Foundation supports Tree Research, Exploration, and Education (hence, TREE). The Foundation has supported scholarships for students from developing countries to learn about forest conservation in the U.S., built the Myakka River canopy walkway (America's first public treetop walk), conserved valuable forest fragments, the church forests, in Ethiopia with a unique science-religion partnership, and continuously promotes education of youth about forest conservation.

== Canopy access ==
Lowman has developed expertise in using different canopy access techniques such as slingshot-fired ropes, hot air balloons with sleds, canopy cranes, and canopy walkways. In 2000, the Myakka River State Park canopy walkway opened following a 1997 proposal from Lowman. It includes a walkway through Florida Oak-Palm Hammock and a tower that reveals a "sea of green" above the treetops, offering visitors a unique perspective on the importance of forest conservation.

Lowman currently leads the TREE Foundation's flagship initiative, Mission Green, which aims to build canopy walkways in biodiversity hotspots around the world to promote forest conservation and environmental education. Through Mission Green, researchers, students, and the public gain safe access to forest canopies, fostering greater understanding of ecosystems and biodiversity.

== Awards and honors ==
- Cover review in the New York Times Sunday Book Review for Life in the Treetops, 1999.
- Margaret Douglas Medal for Excellence in Conservation Education from the Garden Club of America.
- Williams College Bicentennial Medal for achievements in tropical botany, 2000.
- Girls, Inc. Visionary Award for Public Science & Education Outreach, 2000.
- American Association of Botanical Gardens and Arboreta (AABGA) Award for Program Excellence in creating two canopy walkways, one at Selby Gardens with Americans with Disabilities Act accessibility, and one at Myakka State Park, 2001.
- Ecological Society of America, Eugene Odum Prize for Excellence in Ecology Education, 2002.
- Kilby Laureate Medalist for work as a rainforest canopy expert, 2002.
- Asteroid (10739) Lowman named by Carolyn Shoemaker of the U.S. Department of the Interior, 2003.
- Woman in Power Award, National Council of Jewish Women (NCJW), 2003.
- Selected three times as Chief Scientist, The JASON Project in Science Education (2004, 1999, 1994 in Panama, Peru, and Belize, respectively).
- Aldo Leopold Leadership Fellow, 2006.
- Lifetime Achievement Award for Conservation from Sarasota County, 2006.
- Roy Chapman Andrews Society Distinguished Explorer Award, 2014
- Mendel Medal for achievements in science and spirit, 2007.
- Lowell Thomas Medal for discoveries in the canopy (presented October 18, 2006).
- Fulbright Senior Specialist Scholarship to India and Ethiopia (January 2011).
- Elected Fellow of the Ecological Society of America, 2016
- National Geographic funding to conserve church forests in Ethiopia and to survey canopy biodiversity in Cameroon and Colombia (as a National Geographic Explorer since 1998).
- Tällberg‑SNF‑Eliasson Global Leadership Prize, 2023.
- Explorers Medal, The Explorers Club, 2023.
- Tällberg Award, 2024.

== Selected publications ==
=== Books ===
- Lowman, M.D. 1974. Some Aspects of the Fabric of Life. U.S. Department of Health, Education and Welfare 204 pp.
- Heatwole, H. and Lowman, M.D. 1986. Dieback: The Death of an Australian Landscape. Reed & Co. 150 pp.
- Lowman, M.D. (ed.) 1992. Ecology of Hopkins Forest. Williams College Printers. 100 pp.
- Lowman, M.D. and Nadkarni, N.M. (eds.) 1995. Forest Canopies. Academic Press 624 pp. (Second Edition in paperback 1996)
- Lowman, M.D. 1999. Life in the Treetops. Yale University Press. (Editions in German, Chinese and Korean)
- Lowman, M.D. and Rinker, H.B. (eds.) 2004. Forest Canopies. Elsevier Press. (All articles peer-reviewed, with several chapters written by M.D. Lowman)
- Lowman, M.D., Burgess, E. and Burgess, J. 2006. It’s a Jungle Out There – More Tales from the Treetops. Yale University Press.
- Lowman, M.D., Schowalter, T. and Franklin, J. 2011. Methods in Forest Canopy Research. University of California Press.
- Lowman, M.D., Devy, S. and Ganesh, T. 2013. Treetops at Risk. Springer Verlag
- Lowman, M.D. and Mulat, W. 2014. Beza – Who Saved the Forests of Ethiopia, One Church at a Time. Peppertree Press (children's book), both English and Amharic versions. ISBN 9781614932529
