= Fecal microbiota transplant =

Process of transplantation of fecal bacteria from a healthy individual into a recipient

- Escherichia coli at 10,000× magnification
- Other names: Fecal bacteriotherapy, fecal transfusion, fecal transplant, stool transplant
- Specialty: Gastroenterology

Fecal microbiota transplant
Clinical data
- ATC code: None

Legal status
- Legal status: AU: C2

Fecal microbiota transplant (FMT), also known as a stool transplant, is the process of transferring fecal bacteria and other microbes from a healthy individual into an unhealthy individual. FMT is an effective treatment for Clostridioides difficile infection (CDI). For recurrent CDI, FMT is more effective than vancomycin alone, and may improve the outcome after the first index infection.

Side effects include a risk of infections; therefore, donors should be screened for pathogens.

With CDI becoming more common, FMT is gaining prominence. Some experts call for it to become the first-line therapy for CDI. FMT has been used experimentally to treat other gastrointestinal diseases, including colitis, constipation, irritable bowel syndrome, and neurological conditions, such as multiple sclerosis and Parkinson's. In the United States, human feces have been regulated as an experimental drug since 2013. In the United Kingdom, FMT regulation is under the remit of the Medicines and Healthcare products Regulatory Agency.

== Medical uses ==
=== Clostridioides difficile infection ===
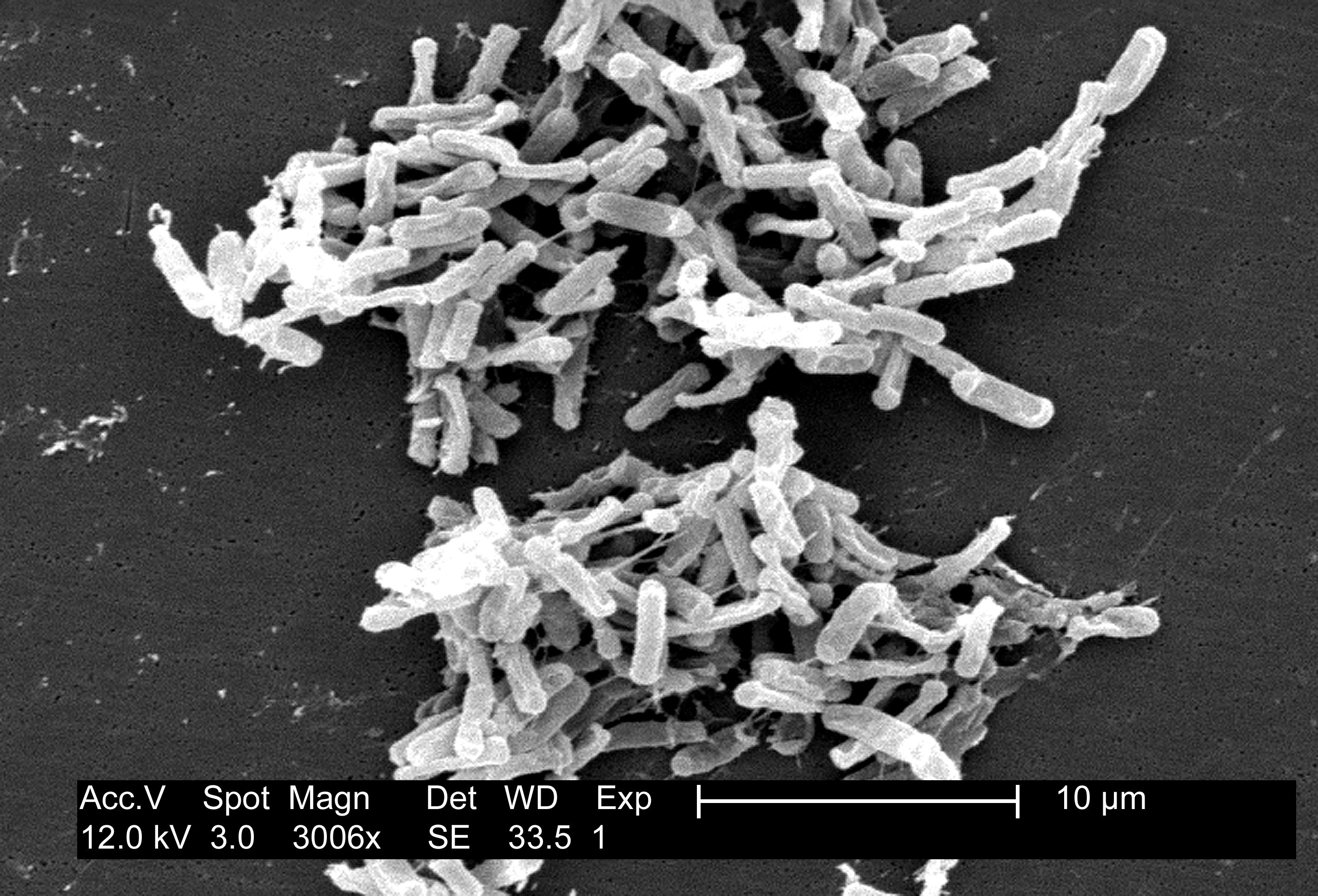
Scanning electron micrograph of Clostridioides difficile bacteria from a stool sample

Fecal microbiota transplant is approximately 85–90% effective in people with CDI for whom antibiotics have not worked or in whom the disease recurs following antibiotics. Most patients recover with a single FMT treatment.

A 2009 study found that FMT was an effective and simple procedure that was more cost-effective than continued antibiotic administration and reduced the incidence of antibiotic resistance.

Once considered to be a "last-resort therapy" by some medical professionals, due to its unusual nature and invasiveness compared with antibiotics, perceived potential risk of infection transmission, and lack of Medicare coverage for donor stool, position statements by specialists in infectious diseases and other societies have moved toward acceptance as a standard therapy for relapsing CDI and toward US Medicare.

It has been recommended that endoscopic FMT be elevated to first-line treatment for people with deterioration and severe relapsing C. difficile infection.

In November 2022, FMT (Biomictra) was approved for medical use in Australia, and fecal microbiota, live (Rebyota) was approved for medical use in the United States.

Fecal microbiota spores, live (Vowst) was approved for medical use in the United States in April 2023. It is the first fecal microbiota product that is taken by mouth.

=== Ulcerative colitis ===
In May 1988, Australian professor Thomas Borody treated the first ulcerative colitis patient using FMT, which led to longstanding symptom resolution. Following on from that, Justin D. Bennet published the first case report documenting reversal of Bennet's own colitis using FMT. While C. difficile is easily eradicated with a single FMT infusion, this generally appears to not be the case with ulcerative colitis. Published experience of ulcerative colitis treatment with FMT largely shows that multiple and recurrent infusions are required to achieve prolonged remission or cure.

=== Fibromyalgia and IBS ===
A 2024 review found that fecal microbiota transplantation may reduce pain intensity and improve fatigue and quality of life in patients with fibromyalgia. A 2023 review found that fecal microbiota transplantation improved symptoms of irritable bowel syndrome compared to a placebo.

== Adverse effects ==
Adverse effects were poorly understood as of 2016. They have included bacterial blood infections, fever, SIRS-like syndrome, exacerbation of inflammatory bowel disease in people who also had that condition, and mild GI distress which generally resolve themselves soon after the procedure, including flatulence, diarrhea, irregular bowel movements, abdominal distension/bloating, abdominal pain/tenderness, constipation, cramping, and nausea. There are also concerns that it may spread COVID-19.

In 2019, a person died in the United States after receiving an FMT that contained drug-resistant bacteria, and another person who received the same transplant was also infected. The US Food and Drug Administration (FDA) issued a warning against potentially life-threatening consequences of transplanting material from improperly screened donors.

== Technique ==
There are evidence-based consensus guidelines for the optimal administration of FMT. Such documents outline the FMT procedure, including preparation of material, donor selection and screening, and FMT administration.

The gut microbiota comprises all microorganisms that reside along the gastrointestinal tract, including commensal, symbiotic and pathogenic organisms. FMT is the transfer of fecal material containing bacteria and natural antibacterials from a healthy individual into a diseased recipient.

=== Donor selection ===
Preparing for the procedure requires careful selection and screening of the potential donor. Close relatives are often chosen on account of ease of screening; however, in the case of treatment of active C. diff., family members and intimate contacts may be more prone to be carriers themselves. This screening involves medical history questionnaires, screening for various chronic medical diseases (e.g. irritable bowel diseases, Crohn's disease, gastrointestinal cancer, etc.), and laboratory testing for pathogenic gastrointestinal infections (e.g. CMV, C. diff., salmonella, Giardia, GI parasites, etc.).

=== Specimen preparation ===
No laboratory standards have been agreed upon, so recommendations vary for size of sample to be prepared, ranging from 30 to 100 grams (1.1 to 3.5 ounces) of fecal material for effective treatment. Fresh stool is used to increase viability of bacteria within the stool and samples are prepared within 6–8 hours. The sample is then diluted with 2.5–5 times the volume of the sample with either normal saline, sterile water, or 4% milk. Some locations mix the sample and the solvent with a mortar and pestle, and others use a blender. There is concern with blender use on account of the introduction of air which may decrease efficacy as well as aerosolization of the feces contaminating the preparation area. The suspension is then strained through a filter and transferred to an administration container. If the suspension is to be used later, it can be frozen after being diluted with 10% glycerol, and used without loss of efficacy compared to the fresh sample. The fecal transplant material is then prepared and administered in a clinical environment to ensure that precautions are taken.

=== Administration ===
After being made into suspensions, the fecal material can be given through nasogastric and nasoduodenal tubes, or through a colonoscope or as a retention enema.

== Mechanism of action ==
One hypothesis behind fecal microbiota transplant rests on the concept of bacterial interference, i.e., using harmless bacteria to displace pathogenic organisms, such as by competitive niche exclusion. In the case of CDI, the C. difficile pathogen is identifiable. Recently, in a pilot study of five patients, sterile fecal filtrate was demonstrated to be of comparable efficacy to conventional FMT in the treatment of recurrent CDI. The conclusion from this study was that soluble filtrate components (such as bacteriophages, metabolites, and/or bacterial components, such as enzymes) may be the key mediators of FMT's efficacy, rather than intact bacteria. It has now been demonstrated that the short-chain fatty acid valerate is restored in human fecal samples from CDI patients and a bioreactor model of recurrent CDI by FMT, but not by antibiotic cessation alone; as such, this may be a key mediator of FMT's efficacy. Other studies have identified rapid-onset but well-maintained changes in the gut bacteriophage profile after successful FMT (with colonisation of the recipient with donor bacteriophages), and this is therefore another key area of interest.

In contrast, in the case of other conditions such as ulcerative colitis, no single culprit has yet been identified. However, analysis of gut microbiome and metabolome changes after FMT as treatment for ulcerative colitis has identified some possible candidates of interest.

== History ==
The first use of donor feces as a therapeutic agent for food poisoning and diarrhea was recorded in the Handbook of Emergency Medicine by a Chinese man, Hong Ge, in the 4th century. Twelve hundred years later, Ming dynasty physician Li Shizhen used "yellow soup" (aka "golden syrup") which contained fresh, dry or fermented stool to treat abdominal diseases. "Yellow soup" was made of fecal matter and water, which was drunk by the person.

The consumption of "fresh, warm camel feces" has also been recommended by Bedouins as a remedy for bacterial dysentery; its efficacy, probably attributable to the antimicrobial subtilisin produced by Bacillus subtilis, was anecdotally confirmed by German soldiers of the Afrika Korps during World War II. However, this story is likely a myth; independent research was not able to verify any of these claims.

The first use of FMT in western medicine was published in 1958 by Ben Eiseman and colleagues, a team of surgeons from Colorado, who treated four critically ill people with fulminant pseudomembranous colitis (before C. difficile was the known cause) using fecal enemas, which resulted in a rapid return to health. For over two decades, FMT has been provided as a treatment option at the Centre for Digestive Diseases in Five Dock, Australia, by Thomas Borody, the modern-day proponent of FMT. In May 1988 their group treated the first ulcerative colitis patient using FMT, which resulted in complete resolution of all signs and symptoms long-term. In 1989 they treated a total of 55 patients with constipation, diarrhea, abdominal pain, ulcerative colitis, and Crohn's disease with FMT. After FMT, 20 patients were considered "cured" and a further nine patients had a reduction in symptoms. Stool transplants are considered about 90 percent effective in those with severe cases of C. difficile colonization, in whom antibiotics have not worked.

The first randomized controlled trial in C. difficile infection was published in January 2013. The study was stopped early due to the effectiveness of FMT, with 81% of patients achieving cure after a single infusion and over 90% achieving a cure after a second infusion.

Since that time, various institutions have offered FMT as a therapeutic option for a variety of conditions.

== Society and culture ==
=== Regulation ===
Interest in FMT grew in 2012 and 2013, as measured by the number of clinical trials and scientific publications.

In the United States, the FDA announced in February 2013 that it would hold a public meeting entitled "Fecal Microbiota for Transplantation" which was held on May 2–3, 2013. In May 2013 the FDA also announced that it had been regulating human fecal material as a drug. The American Gastroenterological Association (AGA), the American College of Gastroenterology (ACG), the American Society for Gastrointestinal Endoscopy (ASGE), and the North American Society for Pediatric Gastroenterology, Hepatology and Nutrition (NASPGHAN) sought clarification, and the FDA Center for Biologics Evaluation and Research (CBER) stated that FMT falls within the definition of a biological product as defined in the Public Health Service Act and the definition of a drug within the meaning of the Federal Food, Drug, and Cosmetic Act. It argued since FMT is used to prevent, treat, or cure a disease or condition, and intended to affect the structure or any function of the body, "a product for such use" would require an Investigational New Drug (IND) application.

In July 2013, the FDA issued an enforcement policy ("guidance") regarding the IND requirement for using FMT to treat C. difficile infection unresponsive to standard therapies (78 FR 42965, July 18, 2013).

In March 2014, the FDA issued a proposed update (called "draft guidance") that, when finalized, is intended to supersede the July 2013 enforcement policy for FMT to treat C. difficile infections unresponsive to standard therapies. It proposed an interim discretionary enforcement period, if 1) informed consent is used, mentioning investigational aspect and risks, 2) stool donor is known to either the person with the condition or physician, and 3) stool donor and stool are screened and tested under the direction of the physician (79 FR 10814, February 26, 2014). Some doctors and people who want to use FMT have been worried that the proposal, if finalized, would shutter the handful of stool banks which have sprung up, using anonymous donors and ship to providers hundreds of miles away.

As of 2015, FMT for recurrent C. difficile infections can be done without mandatory donor and stool screening, whereas FMT for other indications cannot be performed without an IND.

The FDA has issued three safety alerts regarding the transmission of pathogens. The first safety alert, issued in June 2019, described the transmission of a multidrug resistant organism from a donor stool that resulted in the death of one person. The second safety alert, issued in March 2020, was regarding FMT produced from improperly tested donor stools from a stool bank which resulted in several hospitalizations and two deaths. A safety alert in late March 2020, was due to concerns of transmission of COVID-19 in donor stool.

In November 2022, the Australian Therapeutic Goods Administration approved faecal microbiota under the brand name Biomictra, and the US FDA approved a specific C. difficile fecal microbiota treatment under the brand name Rebyota, administered rectally. In April 2023, the FDA approved a live spore capsule that can be taken by mouth, under the brand name Vowst.

=== Stool banks ===
In 2012, a team of researchers from the Massachusetts Institute of Technology founded OpenBiome, the first public stool bank in the United States.

Across Europe, numerous stool banks have emerged to serve the increasing demand. While consensus exists, standard operation procedures still differ. Institutions in the Netherlands have published their protocols for managing FMT, and in Denmark institutions manages FMT according to the European Tissue and Cell directive.

=== Names ===
Previous terms for the procedure include fecal bacteriotherapy, fecal transfusion, fecal transplant, stool transplant, fecal enema, and human probiotic infusion (HPI). Because the procedure involves the complete restoration of the entire fecal microbiota, not just a single agent or combination of agents, these terms have been replaced by the term fecal microbiota transplantation.

== Research ==
Cultured intestinal bacteria are being studied as an alternative to fecal microbiota transplant. One example is the rectal bacteriotherapy (RBT), developed by Tvede and Helms, containing 12 individually cultured strains of anaerobic and aerobic bacteria originating from healthy human faeces. Research has also been done to identify the most relevant microbes within fecal transplants, which could then be isolated and manufactured via industrial fermentation; such standardized products would be more scalable, would reduce the risk of infections from unwanted microbes, and would improve the scientific study of the approach, since the same substance would be administered each time.

== Veterinary use ==
Elephants, hippos, koalas, and pandas are born with sterile intestines, and to digest vegetation need bacteria which they obtain by eating their mothers' feces, a practice termed coprophagia. Other animals eat dung.

In veterinary medicine, fecal microbiota transplant is known as transfaunation and is used to treat ruminating animals, like cows and sheep, by feeding rumen contents of a healthy animal to another individual of the same species in order to colonize its gastrointestinal tract with normal bacteria.
