= Crohn's & Colitis Foundation =

American non-profit organization

- Abbreviation: The Foundation
- Founded: December 17, 1965; 60 years ago
- Founders: Shelby & William Modell, Suzanne & Irwin M. Rosenthal, and Dr. Henry Janowitz
- Tax ID no.: 13-6193105
- Legal status: 501(c)(3) nonprofit organization
- Headquarters: New York City
- Region served: United States
- Methods: Funds research of Crohn's disease and ulcerative colitis, and provides information about Crohn's disease and ulcerative colitis
- Chairman of the Board: Dr. Brent Polk
- President and Chief Executive Officer: Michael Osso
- Revenue: $93,810,978 (2022)
- Expenses: $93,795,995 (2022)
- Employees: 200-500 (2022)
- Volunteers: (2013)
- Website: www.crohnscolitisfoundation.org
- Formerly called: National Foundation for Ileitis and Colitis, Crohn's and Colitis Foundation of America

The Crohn's & Colitis Foundation (The Foundation) is a volunteer fueled non-profit organization in the US that works to fund research to find cures for Crohn's disease and ulcerative colitis, collectively known as inflammatory bowel disease (IBD), and to improve the quality of life of children and adults affected by these digestive diseases. Founded by Shelby and William Modell, Suzanne and Irwin Rosenthal, and Dr. Henry Janowitz, it was launched publicly on September 12, 1967, as the National Foundation for Ileitis and Colitis. (The Foundation was later renamed the Crohn's & Colitis Foundation of America and is now the Crohn's & Colitis Foundation.) It was incorporated on December 17, 1965. The Foundation serves millions of patients diagnosed with IBD in the U.S., through its national headquarters in NYC, and more than 30 chapters nationwide.

Research, educational workshops, as well as symposia, along with the Foundation's scientific journal, Inflammatory Bowel Diseases, enable medical professionals to keep pace with this rapidly growing field. The National Institutes of Health has commended the Foundation for "uniting the research community and strengthening IBD research". The Foundation ranks third among leading health non-profits in the percentage of expense devoted to mission-critical programs, with at least 80 cents of every dollar the Foundation spends going toward medical research, professional education, and patient support.

== Research ==
The Crohn's & Colitis Foundation funds studies at medical institutions, nurtures investigators at the early stages of their careers, and finances underdeveloped areas of research to find the causes of and cures for Crohn's and colitis. The Foundation has provided more than $500 million for Crohn's and colitis research to date.

== Patients and Caregivers ==
The Crohn's & Colitis Foundation offers literature and patient support services nationally as well as through its more than 30 regional chapters. The Foundation provides information and education for the estimated 1 in 100 inflammatory bowel disease (IBD) patients and their families through a variety of periodicals (Take Charge, Under the Microscope), books, awareness campaigns, local chapter events, Webcasts, and through its web site.[3] Due to its extensive public awareness and outreach efforts, the Foundation reaches at least one out of every 18 patients, compared to the Arthritis Foundation, with one out of every 85, or the Juvenile Diabetes Research Foundation, with one out of every 435.

== Advocacy ==
Advocacy is a major component of the Crohn's & Colitis Foundation's mission. Its advocates are not only patients, but family members, friends, caregivers, and healthcare professionals who want to make their voices heard and see a future free from IBD. The Foundation advocates on behalf of IBD patients, caregivers, and healthcare providers. Foundation advocates call for increased Federal funding for Crohn's and colitis research and awareness programs designed to improve the lives of patients and improved access to care.

== Crohn's and Colitis Awareness Week and World IBD Day ==
The Crohn's & Colitis Foundation successfully lobbied Congress to designate the week of December 1–7 as Crohn's and Colitis Awareness Week in order to encourage all Americans to join in the effort to find cures for these diseases, help raise awareness, and support research. The first event occurred in 2011 through U.S. Senate Resolution 199. Most countries worldwide also recognize World IBD Day, which occurs each year on May 19. It has a similar goal of increasing awareness and knowledge of the disease.

== Fundraising ==
The Crohn's & Colitis Foundation primarily relies on the support of members and donors to continue its work. The Foundation raises funds through its local and nationwide special events, spearheaded by its national Team Challenge and Take Steps programs.

Team Challenge is the Foundation's endurance training and fundraising program, which prepares participants to run or walk a half marathon, take part in a cycling event, or experience a sprint triathlon while raising money for cures.

Take Steps, the Foundation's largest fundraising event, mobilizes participants in over 150 local communities across the nation to come together and walk for Crohn's and colitis research.

The Foundation received $3,042,350 in grants from the United States Department of Health and Human Services between 2008 and 2015. Its corporate sponsors from 2018-2022 include:

- AbbVie
- Alfasigma
- Allergan
- AMAG Pharmaceuticals
- Amgen
- Arena Pharmaceuticals
- Amazon Web Services
- Bank of America
- Bellin Health
- Bloomberg L.P.
- BNY Mellon
- Boehringer Ingelheim
- Bristol Myers Squibb
- Celgene
- Centene Corporation
- Children's Hospital of Philadelphia
- Cohen Children's Medical Center
- Connecticut Children's Medical Center
- Daiichi Sankyo
- DiaSorin
- Dude Wipes
- The Durst Organization
- Eli Lilly and Company
- Epic Systems
- ESPN
- ET Browne (Palmer's)
- Express Scripts
- FCB Health
- Ferring Pharmaceuticals
- Gilead Sciences
- GlaxoSmithKline
- Goldman Sachs
- Highmark Foundation
- Insperity
- Janssen
- Jefferies and Company
- Johnson & Johnson
- Mayo Foundation for Medical Education and Research
- Medtronic
- MetLife
- Microsoft
- Nephroceuticals
- Nestlé
- Nevada State Bank
- New York Life Insurance Company
- Northwell Health
- NYU Langone Health
- OptumRx
- Organon
- Paysafe
- Pfizer
- ReachMD
- Salix Pharmaceuticals
- Sandoz
- Sangamo Therapeutics
- Sanofi
- Second Genome
- Seres Therapeutics
- Shire
- Syneos Health
- Takeda Pharmaceutical Company
- UCB
- UnitedHealth Group
- University of Pittsburgh Medical Center (UPMC)
- Walmart Foundation
- WebMD
- Wells Fargo

=== Great Comebacks Awards ===
Crohn's & Colitis Foundation of America established the Great Comebacks Awards in 1984 in order to recognize individuals who have triumphed over inflammatory bowel disease. In 1991, the award was given to Dr. P. Kent Cullen, a colon surgeon who has ulcerative colitis and has undergone multiple ostomy surgeries.

== Mission ==
The mission of the Crohn's & Colitis Foundation is "to cure Crohn's disease and ulcerative colitis, and to improve the quality of life of children and adults affected by these diseases."

== See also ==
- Crohn's and Colitis Canada
- Crohn's and Colitis UK
