= Rifalazil =

Antibiotic

Names
- IUPAC name (2S,16Z,18E,20S,21S,22R,23R,24R,25S,26R,27S,28E)-5,12,21,23-tetrahydroxy-27-methoxy-2,4,16,20,22,24,26-heptamethyl-10-[4-(2-methylpropyl)piperazin-1-yl]-1,6,15-trioxo-1,2-dihydro-6H-2,7-(epoxypentadeca[1,11,13]trienoimino)[1]benzofuro[4,5-a]phenoxazin-25-yl acetate
- Systematic IUPAC name (7S,9E,11S,12R,13S,14R,15R,16R,17S,18S,19E,21Z)-2,15,17,32-Tetrahydroxy-30-(4-isobutyl-1-piperazinyl)-11-methoxy-3,7,12,14,16,18,22-heptamethyl-6,23,37-trioxo-8,27,38-trioxa-24,34-diazahexacyclo[23.11;.1.1^{4,7}.0^{5,36}.0^{26,35}.0^{28,33}]octatriaconta-1(36),2,4,9,19,21,25,28,30,32,34-undecaen-13-yl acetate

Identifiers
CAS Number	129791-92-0
3D model (JSmol)	Interactive image
ChemSpider	16736451
KEGG	D02550
PubChem CID	6540558
UNII	S1976TE8QK
- InChI: InChI=1S/C51H64N4O13/c1-24(2)23-54-16-18-55(19-17-54)32-21-33(57)39-35(22-32)67-48-40(52-39)36-37-44(60)30(8)47-38(36)49(62)51(10,68-47)65-20-15-34(64-11)27(5)46(66-31(9)56)29(7)43(59)28(6)42(58)25(3)13-12-14-26(4)50(63)53-41(48)45(37)61/h12-15,20-22,24-25,27-29,34,42-43,46,57-60H,16-19,23H2,1-11H3,(H,53,63)/b13-12+,20-15+,26-14-/t25-,27+,28+,29+,34-,42-,43+,46+,51-/m0/s1
- SMILES: C[C@H]1C=CC=C(C(=O)N=C2C3=C(C4=C5C(=C(C(=C4C2=O)O)C)O[C@@](C5=O)(OC=C[C@@H]([C@H]([C@H]([C@@H]([C@@H]([C@@H]([C@H]1O)C)O)C)OC(=O)C)C)OC)C)NC6=C(O3)C=C(C=C6O)N7CCN(CC7)CC(C)C)C

Properties
Chemical formula	C_{51}H_{64}N_{4}O_{13}
Molar mass	941.088 g·mol^{−1}
Solubility in water	Very high water solubility around 2000 mg/mL at a pH of 2 and a low solubility of 0.5 mg/mL at a pH of 5

Pharmacology
- Pharmacokinetics
Biological half-life	8.7±2.7 hours
Legal status	Development terminated
- Except where otherwise noted, data are given for materials in their standard state (at 25 °C [77 °F], 100 kPa). Infobox references

Rifalazil (also known as KRM-1648 and AMI-1648) is an antibiotic substance that kills bacterial cells by blocking off the β-subunit in RNA polymerase. Rifalazil is used as a treatment for many different diseases. The most common are Chlamydia infection, Clostridioides difficile associated diarrhea (CDAD), and tuberculosis (TB). Using rifalazil and the effects that coincide with taking rifalazil for treating a bacterial disease vary from person to person, as does any drug put into the human body. Food interactions and genetic variation are a few causes for the variation in side effects from the use of rifalazil. Its development was terminated in 2013 due to severe side effects.

== Biological properties ==
Rifalazil works well alone, and in conjunction with other antibiotics alone. In a study conducted in 2005, it was found that combining rifalazil with vancomycin increased bacterial killing by a factor of 3. Rifalazil also has a very long half-life which allows for more infrequent dosages as opposed to frequent small dosages of antibiotics.

Many different studies have been conducted that have researched the effect of rifalazil on certain strains of bacterial diseases. In a study conducted in 2004, it was found that rifalazil reduced C. difficile strains when studied in vitro.

== Uses ==
Rifalazil has been developed to treat cases of tuberculosis and chlamydia. It is a very good treatment for tuberculosis because rifalazil achieves a very high concentration in the blood cells and the lungs. In addition, rifalazil is becoming more widely used because it can be used along with many other indications, such as HIV, TB, and MRSA. Rifalazil has a very long half-life which is very useful for certain medications. The drug is administered orally which is also convenient in terms of drug administration. A longer half-life allows for fewer treatments and dosages, which makes this an up-and-coming drug for tuberculosis, CDAD, and chlamydia. Although the uses for rifalazil seem very effective, there are negative side effects that make its use limited. Rifalazil interacts with other drugs and on top of that, rapid resistance develops to other drugs.

=== Tested diseases for rifalazil treatment ===
- Chlamydia infection
- Clostridioides difficile associated diarrhea
- Trachoma
- Tuberculosis
- Leprosy
- Buruli ulcer
