= Church forests of Ethiopia =

Protected sacred forests around rural churches

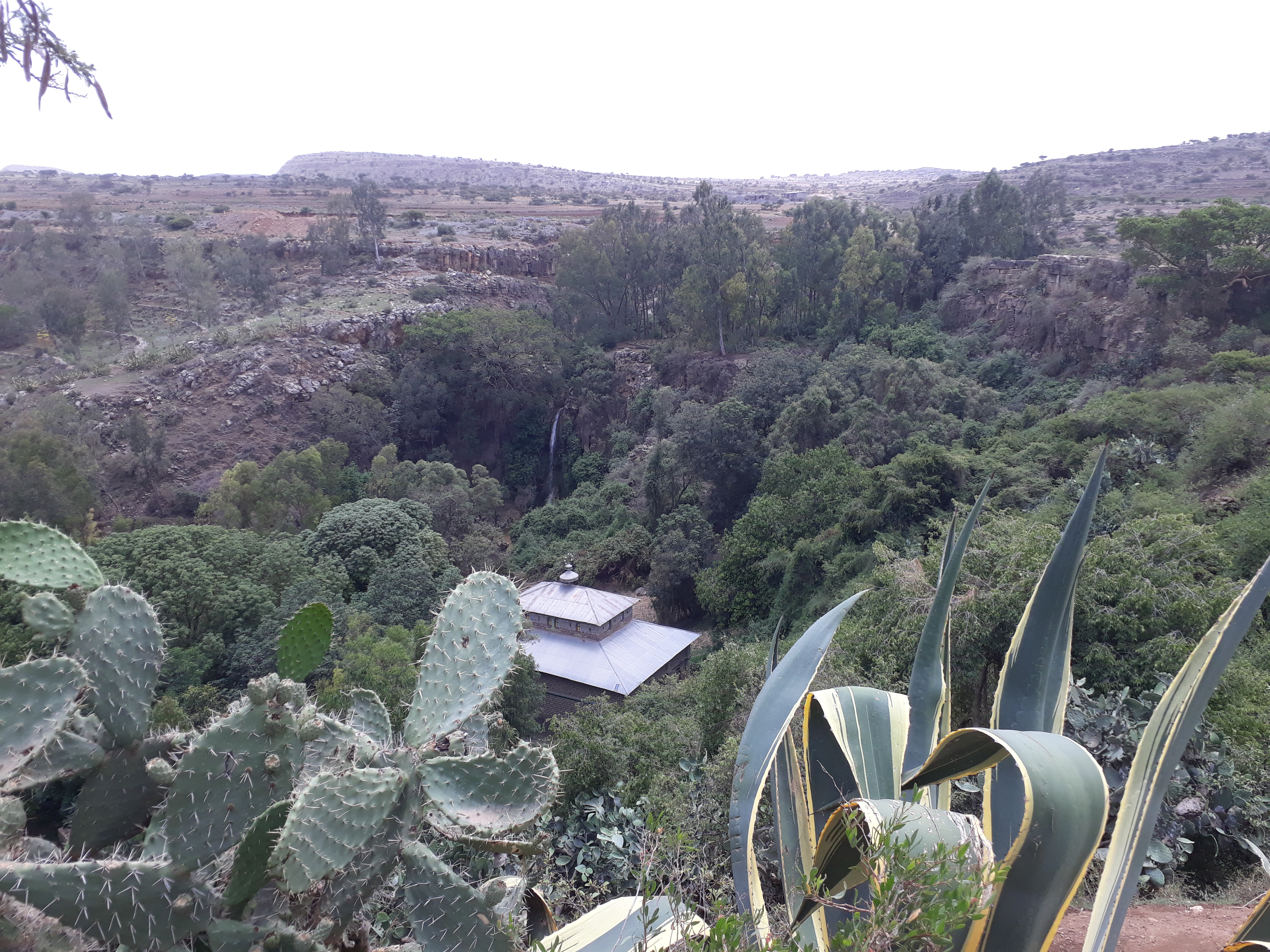
- Maryam Bahrawti church and its forest at Mereb Mi'iti, 2019

Geography
- Location: Ethiopian Highlands, Ethiopia
- Area: 3 to 300 ha (7.4 to 741.3 acres) per forest About 35,000 forests

Administration
- Governing body: Ethiopian Orthodox Tewahedo Church

Ecology
- Disturbance: Livestock grazing, farmland expansion

The church forests of Ethiopia are patches of native forest that surround churches of the Ethiopian Orthodox Tewahedo Church. Ethiopia lost most of its forest cover during the 20th century. In parts of the Ethiopian Highlands, church forests are almost the only native forest left. There are thousands of them. Most cover only a few hectares, and some are thought to be about 1,500 years old.

The forests shelter many plant and animal species. They also benefit nearby farms, for example through pollination and water conservation. They are threatened by grazing livestock and by the spread of farmland. Since 2010, priests, scientists and local communities have built stone walls around some forests to protect them.

== Description ==
A church forest is a patch of forest with a church at its centre. Ethiopia has about 35,000 church forests, scattered across the country. They range in size from 3 to 300 hectares (7.4 to 741.3 acres). Another estimate gives about 20,000 forests in the Ethiopian Highlands, most of them 10 hectares (25 acres) or smaller.

Several studies have focused on the South Gondar Zone of the Amhara Region. A 2019 study counted about 1,022 church forests there. Of these, 93% were smaller than 15 hectares (37 acres) and only nine were larger than 50 hectares (120 acres). Other church forests stand around Lake Tana, for example on the Zege Peninsula.

== History ==
Some church forests are estimated to be about 1,500 years old. The churches have served as community centres since the fourth century.

At the start of the 20th century, forest covered about 45% of Ethiopia. It now covers about 5%. Most of the forest was cleared for farmland and grazing. From 1974 to 1991, the communist government nationalised land, including church estates. This encouraged more clearing. In northern Ethiopia, about 4% of the forest is left. In the Amhara Region, the only native forests that remain are those around churches.

== Religious significance ==
Priests describe each church forest as a small Garden of Eden. Hermits live and pray in the forests. A priest who does not protect the forest is considered to have failed in his mission.

== Ecology ==
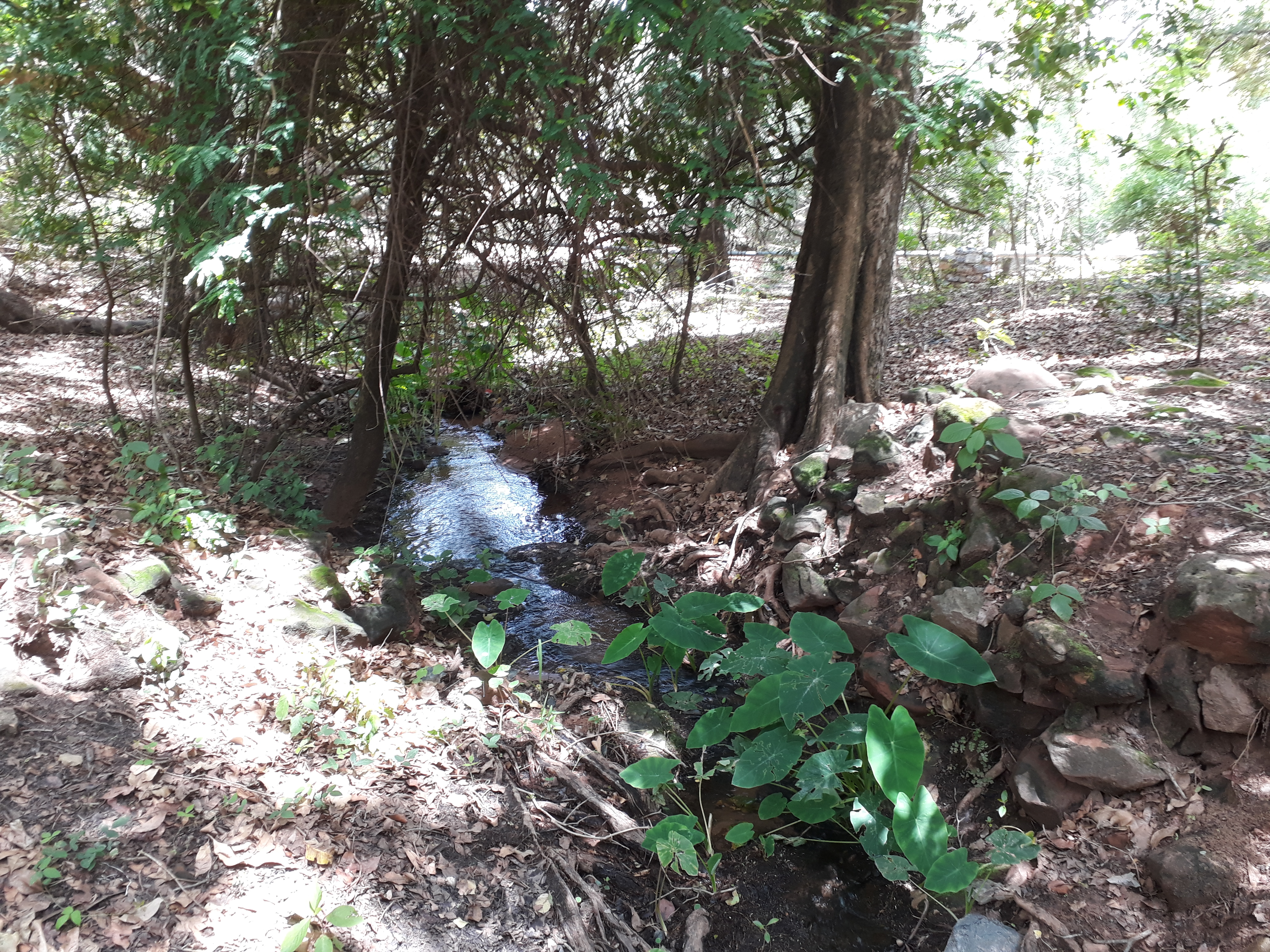
A rare spring in a church forest

A survey of 44 church forests in South Gondar recorded 139 species among more than 11,000 trees. A study of the soil in seven church forests found seeds of 50 plant species, from at least 22 families. Animals seen in the forests include vervet monkeys, porcupines and civets, and birds such as the hamerkop and Rüppell's vulture.

The forests store carbon, conserve water and reduce soil erosion. They also provide medicinal plants. Birds and insects that live in them pollinate nearby crops and control pests.

== Threats ==
Livestock enter the forests and eat the undergrowth and young trees. People collect wood, mostly at the forest edges. Ploughing damages plants at the edges, and fields press against some forests. In an experiment in two church forests, grazing reduced the germination and growth of seedlings of four native tree species and increased their mortality. In fenced plots, more seeds germinated and more seedlings survived.

A 2019 study of 44 church forests in South Gondar found that human disturbance, mainly buildings and clearings, was linked to fewer tree species, fewer trees and fewer seedlings. The effects were stronger in small forests. Eucalyptus trees, which are not native, are spreading into some forests.

== Conservation ==
The forest ecologist Alemayehu Wassie was born in South Gondar in 1971. He documented the plants of 28 church forests for his doctorate at Wageningen University, which he completed in 2007. In the same year he met Meg Lowman, a forest ecologist from the California Academy of Sciences, and they began to work together. With grants from the National Geographic Society, they held workshops for priests. They used Google Earth images to show how much forest had been lost. One workshop drew more than 150 priests.

=== Stone walls ===
The priests proposed building walls around the forests. Villagers build them with stones cleared from nearby fields, which also helps their crops. The walls keep livestock out, but people can still enter. The first wall was built at Zhara in 2010. It enlarged the forest from 8 to 10 hectares (20 to 25 acres). By 2021, about 20 church forests had walls. Some priests have moved their walls outward to enlarge the forest.

Studies in South Gondar found more tree seedlings, of more species, in forests with walls than in forests without them. The trees themselves differed little. The authors of one study explained this by reduced grazing and by visitors keeping to paths. After the wall at Zhara was built, birds returned and the numbers of wild animals and pollinators rose.

=== Local support ===
In a survey in the Dera district published in 2016, 70% of the people asked were willing to pay to manage and protect church forests. The measures they suggested included protection, fencing, planting and enlarging the forests.

== See also ==
- Afromontane
- Edge effects
- Ethiopian montane forests
- List of types of formally designated forests
- Sacred grove
