= Second Genome =

American life sciences research company

- Founded: 2010
- Founder: Corey Goodman; Todd DeSantis
- Headquarters: South San Francisco, United States
- Key people: Peter DiLaura (President, CEO as of 2016)
- Number of employees: 25 (2016)
- Website: www.secondgenome.com

Second Genome is a venture capital funded, life sciences research company based in South San Francisco. The company's focus is on the development and exploitation of a research platform which facilitates the identification and elucidation of relationships between human physiology and the human microbiota, and it has a long term goal of becoming a drug development company. The name "second genome" comes from the notion that humans have, effectively, two genomes: the native human genome, and the more diverse set of genomes carried by the human microbiota.

The company's first foray into drug development was a small molecule treatment for ulcerative colitis (SGM-1019). (Note: Searches in clinicaltrials.gov on 3 August 2017 did not reveal information about trials sponsored by Second Genome or using the therapeutic SGM-1019.) (Note: Timmerman 2016 refers to indication being ulcerative colitis; Lash 2015 refers to indication being Crohn's disease.) The mechanism of SGM-1019 has not been disclosed in detail. Key to the company's business model has been partnerships with large established pharmaceutical companies, including Pfizer and Janssen. Potential competitors to Second Genome include Kaleido Biosciences, Synlogic, Kallyope, Seres Therapeutics, OpenBiome, Rebiotix, Evelo Therapeutics, and Vedanta Biosciences.

Second Genome was founded in 2010 by Corey Goodman, a venture capitalist and former Pfizer executive, and Todd DeSantis, the company's vice president for informatics as of 2019. As of 2013, the company had entered into an ulcerative colitis research agreement with Janssen, the financial arrangement and outcome of which remains to be determined. The company had a headcount of 18 employees as of 2014, which had increased to 25 by 2016. Startup financing was obtained through a Series A round which raised US$11.5 million. A Series B round of funding raised US$42.6 million in 2016. By 2016, the company had established a DNA sequencing service aimed at microbial samples, which provided revenue to supplement venture capital infusions. As of 2019, the company had secured a two-year SBIR grant in collaboration with Oregon State University, aimed at studying microbiome metabolites from people with nervous system disorders, in particular autism.

As of 2016, the company's president and chief executive officer was Peter DiLaura.
