= Nephroceuticals =

- Product type: ProRenal, Cardiamin Multivitamins
- Country: United States
- Introduced: 2008
- Markets: Worldwide
- Tagline: Everything you need, nothing you don't.
- Website: www.nephroceuticals.com
- Products: ProRenal, Cardiamin

Nephroceuticals is a pharmaceutical company based out of Miamisburg, Ohio. Founded in 2008 Nephroceuticals develops and manufactures nutritional supplements that promote health in people with kidney disease and heart disease.

== History ==
Nephroceuticals was founded in 2008 by Dr. John R. Wigneswaran and is based in Miamisburg, Ohio.

May 19, 2009, the National Kidney Foundation announces a partnership with Nephroceuticals that is based on nutrition and early detection for kidney disease. The partnership includes developing and distributing print and online educational materials and supports the foundation's nationwide early detection initiative, the Kidney Early Evaluation Program (KEEP).

December 11, 2009, Nephroceuticals starts marketing a daily multivitamin for people with kidney disease: ProRenal QD with Omega 3 and ProRenal Vital.

March 9, 2012, Nephroceuticals provides a notice of its intent to raise $4 million within a year to add employees and develop new products. Included are plans to develop a supplement for cancer patients, and to launch a multivitamin focused on those with gastrointestinal problems.

== Patents and trademarks ==
Summary of Marks

Serial number	Mark	Registered	Date
85271079	JUST WHAT YOUR HEART NEEDS	Nephroceuticals, LLC	11/22/2011
77878481	CARDIAMIN	Nephroceuticals, LLC	01/18/2011
85029368	PRORENAL	Nephroceuticals, LLC	12/21/2010
77781301	PRORENAL VITAL	NEPHROCEUTICALS, LLC	06/22/2010
77647712	Nephroceuticals	NEPHROCEUTICALS, LLC	9/29/2009
