= Fecal microbiota spores, live =

Medication

Clinical data
- Trade names: Vowst
- Other names: SER-109, fecal microbiota spores, live-brpk
- Routes of administration: By mouth
- ATC code: None

Legal status
- Legal status: US: ℞-only

Live fecal microbiota spores, sold under the brand name Vowst, are a fecal microbiota product used to prevent the recurrence of Clostridioides difficile infection (C. difficile).

Live fecal microbiota spores contain live bacteria and are manufactured from human fecal matter donated by qualified individuals.

Vowst was approved for medical use in the United States in April 2023. It is the first fecal microbiota product that is taken by mouth (orally).

== Medical uses ==
Fecal microbiota spores (live) are indicated to prevent the recurrence of Clostridioides difficile infection (CDI) in individuals 18 years of age and older following antibacterial treatment for recurrent CDI (rCDI).

== History ==
The safety of fecal microbiota spores (live) was evaluated in a randomized, double-blind, placebo-controlled clinical study and an open-label clinical study conducted in the US and Canada. The participants who suffered from recurrent C. difficile infection were subjected to 48 to 96 hours post-antibacterial treatment and their symptoms were controlled.

Across both studies, 346 individuals 18 years of age and older with recurrent C. difficile infection received all scheduled doses of fecal microbiota spores, live. In an analysis among 90 recipients of fecal microbiota spores, live, when compared to 92 recipients of placebo, the most commonly reported side effects by recipients of fecal microbiota spores, live, which occurred at a greater frequency than reported by placebo recipients, were abdominal bloating, fatigue, constipation, chills and diarrhea. The effectiveness of fecal microbiota spores, live was evaluated in the randomized, placebo-controlled clinical study in which 89 participants received fecal microbiota spores, live and 93 participants received placebo. Through eight weeks after treatment, CDI recurrence in Vowst-treated participants was lower compared to placebo-treated participants (12.4% compared to 39.8%).

The FDA granted the application for fecal microbiota spores, live-brpk priority review, breakthrough therapy, and orphan drug designations. The FDA granted approval of Vowst to Seres Therapeutics Inc.
