= Inflammatory Bowel Diseases =

- Discipline: Gastroenterology
- Language: English
- Edited by: Fabio Cominelli

Publication details
- History: 1995-present
- Publisher: Oxford University Press
- Frequency: Monthly
- Impact factor: 7.29 (2021)

Standard abbreviations
- ISO 4: Inflamm. Bowel Dis.

Indexing
- ISSN: 1078-0998 (print); 1536-4844 (web)
- LCCN: 94003800 sn 94003800
- OCLC no.: 30992688

Links
- Journal homepage; Online access; Online archive

Inflammatory Bowel Diseases is a monthly peer-reviewed medical journal covering all aspects of inflammatory bowel disease. It was established in 1995 and is published by Oxford University Press. It is the official journal of the Crohn's & Colitis Foundation. The editor-in-chief is Fabio Cominelli (Case Western Reserve University). According to the Journal Citation Reports, the journal has a 2021 impact factor of 7.29, ranking it 22nd out of 93 journals in the category "Gastroenterology & Hepatology".
