= Fecal microbiota =

Clinical data
- Trade names: Rebyota
- Other names: RBX2660, fecal microbiota, live - jslm
- License data: US DailyMed: Donor human stool
- Routes of administration: Rectal
- ATC code: None

Legal status
- Legal status: CA: ℞-only; US: ℞-only

Fecal microbiota, sold under the brand name, Rebyota is used for the prevention of recurrence of Clostridioides difficile infection.

The most commonly reported adverse reactions include abdominal pain, diarrhea, abdominal distention, flatulence, and nausea.

Fecal microbiota is prepared from stool donated by qualified individuals. The donors and the donated stool are tested for a panel of transmissible pathogens. Fecal microbiota is the first fecal microbiota product approved by the US Food and Drug Administration (FDA). Fecal microbiota was approved for medical use in the United States in November 2022.

== Medical uses ==
Fecal microbiota is approved for the prevention of recurrence of Clostridioides difficile infection (CDI) in people 18 years of age and older. It is for use after an individual has completed antibiotic treatment for recurrent CDI.

== History ==
The safety of fecal microbiota was assessed from two randomized, double-blind, placebo-controlled clinical studies and from open-label clinical studies conducted in the United States and in Canada. The participants had a history of one or more recurrences of Clostridioides difficile infection. They received one or more doses of fecal microbiota or placebo 24 to 72 hours after completion of antibiotic treatment for their Clostridioides difficile infection; participants' Clostridioides difficile infection was under control at the time of receipt of fecal microbiota or placebo. Across these studies, 978 individuals aged 18 years and older received at least one dose of fecal microbiota. In one study, among 180 fecal microbiota recipients, when compared to 87 placebo recipients, the most common side effects after receiving one dose of fecal microbiota were abdominal pain, diarrhea, abdominal bloating, gas and nausea.

The FDA granted the application for fecal microbiota, live fast track, breakthrough therapy, and orphan drug designations. The FDA granted approval of Rebyota to Ferring Pharmaceuticals Inc.

== Society and culture ==
=== Legal status ===
Fecal microbiota was approved for medical use in the United States in November 2022.
