= OpenBiome =

Nonprofit organization

- Purpose: Health
- Location: Massachusetts
- Chief Executive Officer: Julie Barrett O'Brien
- Website: www.openbiome.org

OpenBiome is a nonprofit health research organization based in Massachusetts accelerating research on the human microbiome. They partner with leading researchers, clinicians and innovators to advance and ensure access to novel and affordable microbiome therapeutics.

== History ==
OpenBiome distributes material to hospitals and clinics to support the treatment of C. difficile, the most common pathogen causing hospital-acquired infection in the U.S. OpenBiome provides frozen preparations of screened and filtered human stool for use in fecal microbiota transplantation (FMT) therapies. In collaboration with their manufacturing partners at the University of Minnesota, OpenBiome provides clinicians with two different liquid formulations of fecal microbiota: MTP101-LR, to treat recurrent C. difficile infection unresponsive to standard therapies, and MTP101-LF, a high-dose formulation intended to treat severe-fulminant C. difficile. As of February 2024, OpenBiome had provided over 70,000 treatments to all 50 states.

OpenBiome was founded in 2012 by Mark Smith, a microbiology student at MIT, and James Burgess, an MBA student at the MIT Sloan School of Management. It is the first public stool bank, and was founded to facilitate use of FMT. The logistical burdens associated with screening and processing fecal material have made it difficult for clinicians to offer FMT to patients with recurrent C. difficile infections.
