= Bacterial therapy =

Design of engineered live bacterial therapeutics

Bacterial therapy is the therapeutic use of bacteria to treat diseases. Bacterial therapeutics are living medicines, and may be wild type bacteria (often in the form of probiotics) or bacteria that have been genetically engineered to possess therapeutic properties that is injected into a patient. Other examples of living medicines include cellular therapeutics (including immunotherapeutics), activators of anti-tumor immunity, or synergizing with existing tools and approaches. and phage therapeutics, or as delivery vehicles for treatment, diagnosis, or imaging, complementing or synergizing with existing tools and approaches.

== Development ==
Workflow for developing engineered strains.

Development of bacterial therapeutics is an extremely active research area in the fields of synthetic biology and microbiology. Currently, there is a large focus on: 1) identifying bacteria that naturally produce therapeutic effects (for example, probiotic bacteria), and 2) genetically programming bacteria to produce therapeutic effects.

=== Design ===
Optimal strain design often requires a balance between strain suitability for function in the target microenvironment and concerns for feasibility of manufacturing and clinical development.

The development workflow should incorporate technologies for optimizing strain potency, as well as predictive in vitro and in vivo assays, as well quantitative pharmacology models, to maximize translational potential for patient populations.

== Applications ==
=== Cancer therapy ===
Schematic of therapeutic bacteria strategies against hypoxic tumors

Mechanisms by which bacteria target tumors

There is tremendous interest in using bacteria as a therapy to treat tumors. In particular, tumor-homing bacteria that thrive in hypoxic environments are particularly attractive for this purpose, as they will tend to migrate to, invade (through the leaky vasculature in the tumor microenvironment) and colonize tumors. This property tends to increase their residence time in the tumor, giving them longer to exert their therapeutic effects, in contrast to other bacteria that would be quickly cleared by the immune system. In addition, colonized bacteria can lyze the tumor, activate anti-tumor immune response, can be engineered as a delivery vehicle for anti-cancer therapeutics and may have the potential as contrast agents for cancer imaging. Microbial-based cancer therapy may offer an opportunity to address the issue of global cancer therapy disparity and introduce more suitable cancer immunotherapy approach to low- and middle-income countries.

==== Mechanism ====
Genetically engineered probiotics as living medicines to treat intestinal inflammation

Bacteria involved in causing and treating cancers

After systemic administration, bacteria localize to the tumor microenvironment. The interactions between bacteria, cancer cells, and the surrounding microenvironment cause various alterations in tumor-infiltrating immune cells, cytokines, and chemokines, which further facilitate tumor regression. ① Bacterial toxins from S. Typhimurium, Listeria, and Clostridium can kill tumor cells directly by inducing apoptosis or autophagy. Toxins delivered via Salmonella can upregulate Connexin 43 (Cx43), leading to bacteria-induced gap junctions between the tumor and dendritic cells (DCs), which allow cross-presentation of tumor antigens to the DCs. ② Upon exposure to tumor antigens and interaction with bacterial components, DCs secrete robust amounts of the proinflammatory cytokine IL-1β, which subsequently activates CD8+ T cells. ③ The antitumor response of the activated CD8+ T cells is further enhanced by bacterial flagellin (a protein subunit of the bacterial flagellum) via TLR5 activation. The perforin and granzyme proteins secreted by activated CD8+ T cells efficiently kill tumor cells in primary and metastatic tumors. ④ Flagellin and TLR5 signaling also decreases the abundance of CD4+ CD25+ regulatory T (Treg) cells, which subsequently improves the antitumor response of the activated CD8+ T cells. ⑤ S. Typhimurium flagellin stimulates NK cells to produce interferon-γ (IFN-γ), an important cytokine for both innate and adaptive immunity. ⑥ Listeria-infected MDSCs shift into an immune-stimulating phenotype characterized by increased IL-12 production, which further enhances the CD8+ T and NK cell responses. ⑦ Both S. Typhimurium and Clostridium infection can stimulate significant neutrophil accumulation. Elevated secretion of TNF-α and TNF-related apoptosis-inducing ligand (TRAIL) by neutrophils enhances the immune response and kills tumor cells by inducing apoptosis. ⑧ The macrophage inflammasome is activated through contact with bacterial components (LPS and flagellin) and Salmonella-damaged cancer cells, leading to elevated secretion of IL-1β and TNF-α into the tumor microenvironment. NK cell: natural killer cell. Treg cell: regulatory T cell. MDSCs: myeloid-derived suppressor cells. P2X7 receptor: purinoceptor 7-extracellular ATP receptor. LPS: lipopolysaccharide

=== Clostridioides difficile infection therapy ===
Alterations in the gut microbiome are thought to be associated with C. difficile infection and recurrence. Therapies include probiotics and fecal microbiota transplantation.

=== Microbiome engineering ===
There is considerable interest in using bacterial therapeutics to alter human gastrointestinal microbiota to help diseases like small intestinal bacterial overgrowth, gut dysbiosis associated with the pathogenesis of food allergy, and other forms of dysbiosis.

== See also ==
- Living medicine
