= Metronomic therapy =

Metronomic therapy is a type of chemotherapy in which anti-cancer drugs are administered in a lower dose than the maximum tolerated dose repetitively over a long period to treat cancers with fewer side effects. Metronomic therapy is shown to affect both tumor microenvironment and tumor cells to achieve its therapeutic effects. Metronomic therapy is also cost-effective as a lower dose is used compared to conventional chemotherapy. The use of metronomic therapy has been extensively investigated and can be advantageous in selected group of patients. Yet, more clinical trials are necessary to generalize the method.

== Comparison with conventional chemotherapy ==
=== Conventional chemotherapy ===
In conventional chemotherapy, a dose close to the maximum tolerated dose is administered in a bolus manner to achieve cytotoxic effects on tumor cells. However, the side effects are often significant as the cytotoxic agents also kill the fast-dividing cells normally present in the body, such as bone marrow cells and epithelial cells of the gastrointestinal tract. A treatment break is thus required to allow recovery in these normal tissues.

=== Metronomic therapy ===
In metronomic therapy, a lower dose, typically varying from one-tenth to one-third of the maximum tolerated dose, is administered frequently to maintain a low concentration of the drugs in the plasma. It is commonly given in oral form, which is more convenient for patients and has a lower cost compared with intravenous form used in conventional chemotherapy. At a low concentration, the drugs primarily act on the tumor microenvironment including the tumor endothelial cells and immune cells. As a lower dose is used, the risk of having severe side effects, such as neutropenia, is lower.

Comparison of characteristics between conventional and metronomic therapy
	Conventional chemotherapy	Metronomic therapy
Dosage	Close to maximum tolerated dose	Much lower than maximum tolerated dose
Dosing interval	Less frequent	More frequent
Route of administration	Various e.g. intravenous, oral	Oral
Mechanisms of action	Cytotoxicity	Various e.g. anti-angiogenesis, immunomodulation
Side effects	More significant	Less severe

== Mechanisms of action ==
Multiple mechanisms of action have been studied in both pre-clinical and clinical settings. Instead of directly killing the tumor cells, the drugs in metronomic therapy suppress tumor growth mainly by inhibiting tumor angiogenesis and modulating the immune response against tumors. There is also emerging evidence that metronomic therapy may also act on tumor cells by inducing tumor dormancy and senescence.

=== Anti-angiogenesis ===
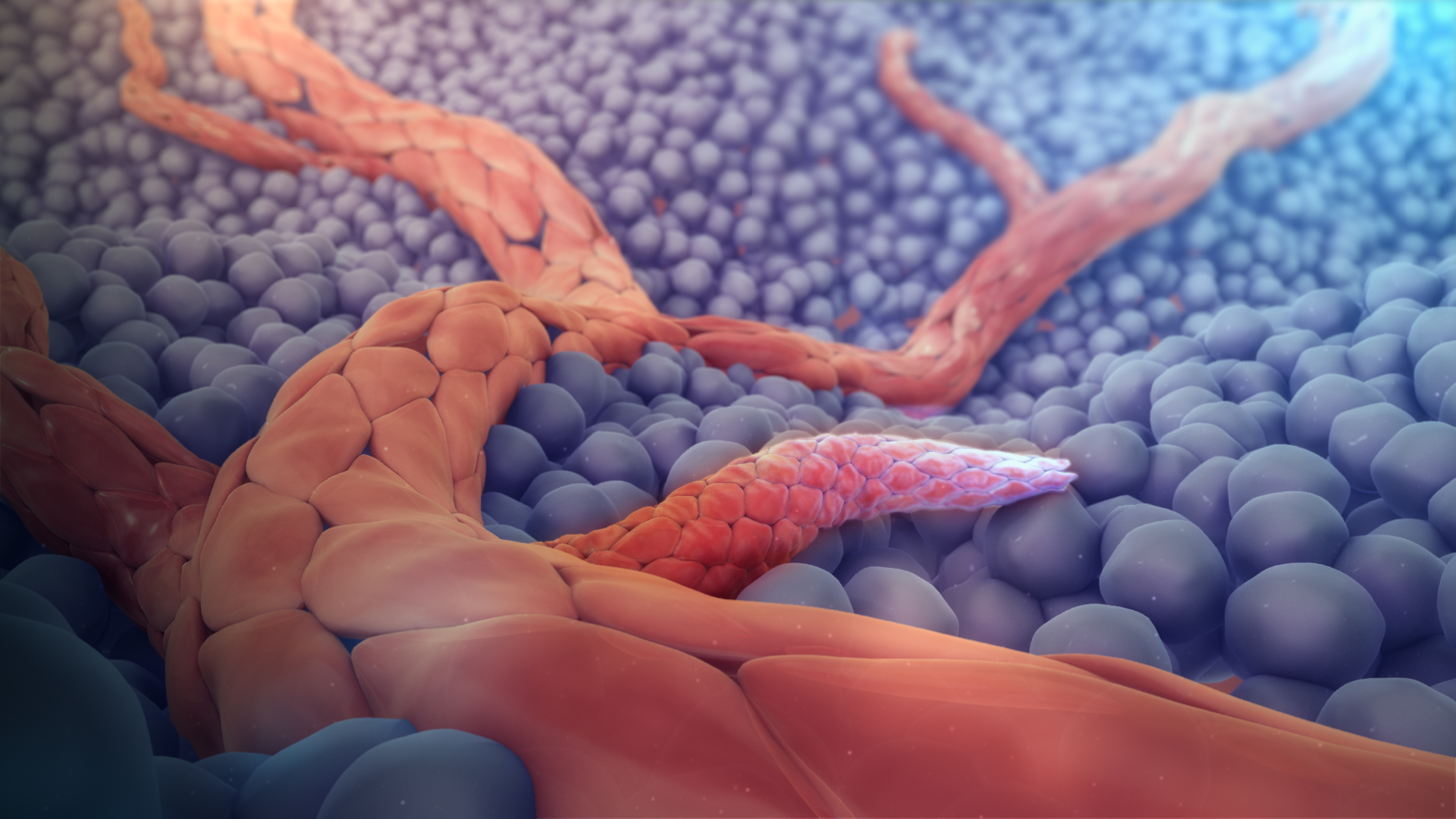
Angiogenesis occurs in cancers.

Angiogenesis supports tumor growth by ensuring sufficient oxygen and nutrient supply to the rapidly-proliferating tumor cells. Metronomic therapy can inhibit tumor angiogenesis by multiple mechanisms. It selectively inhibits the proliferation and induces apoptosis of tumor endothelial cells, without disrupting the endothelial cells of normal blood vessels. This is probably mediated by increasing the expression of thrombospondin-1 (TSP-1), which inhibits angiogenesis. Another target of metronomic therapy is the bone marrow-derived circulating endothelial progenitor cells (CEPs), which are involved in tumor angiogenesis. Metronomic therapy was found to decrease the level of CEPs.

=== Immunomodulation ===
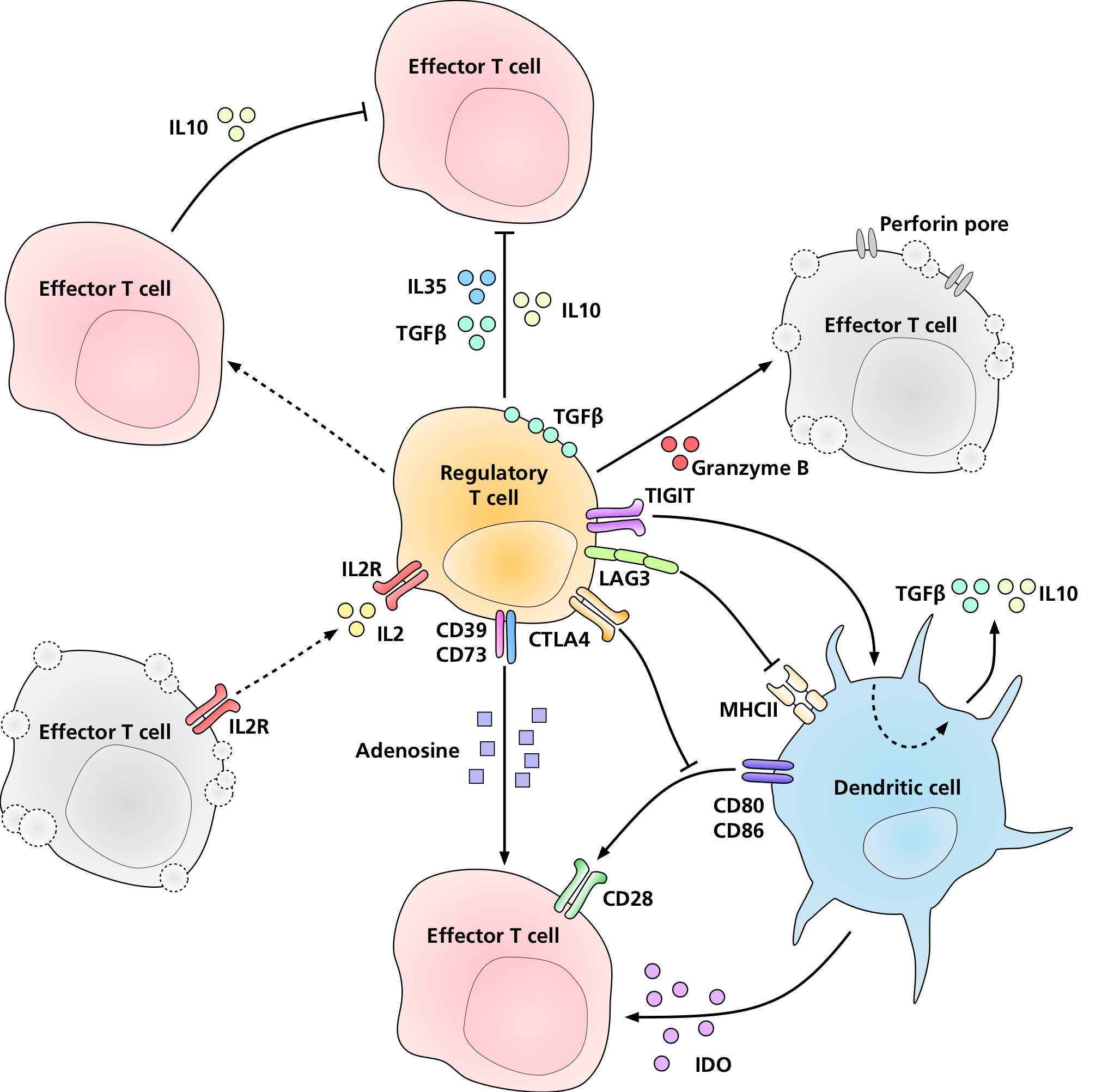
Regulatory T cell, a target of metronomic therapy, can suppress other immune cells.

Tumor cells develop various means to evade immunosurveillance of the host. The number of CD4+ CD25+ FOXP3+ regulatory T cells (Tregs) was found to increase in various types of tumors, suppressing both specific and innate immune responses. Metronomic therapy can selectively inhibit Tregs and therefore activate CD8+ cytotoxic T cells and CD4+ helper T cells responsible for tumor-specific immunity, as well as natural killer cells (NK cells) involved in innate immunity. This selective inhibition is not observed in conventional chemotherapy which reduces the number of all lymphocyte subsets. In addition, some chemotherapeutic agents including cyclophosphamide, methotrexate, vinblastine, paclitaxel and etoposide can promote maturation and antigen-presenting ability of dendritic cells, which in turn facilitate the T-cell mediated immune response against tumors.

== Uses under investigation ==
=== Cancers in adults ===
==== Breast cancer ====
In the breast cancer settings, several drugs that are commonly used in conventional chemotherapy such as methotrexate, cyclophosphamide, vinorelbine and fluoropyrimidines have been tested either as monotherapy or in combination with other therapies including hormonal therapy, targeted therapy and vaccines.

Although there have been many cases that metronomic therapy did not create synergy with other therapies, a number of studies have proven the efficacy of metronomic therapy in treatment of intractable breast cancer. In fact, a recent study presented at American Association for Cancer Research (AACR) congress in 2017 announced the effect of metronomic regimens. The study also encourages further studies about finding appropriate regimen and its optimal dosage.

==== Prostate cancer ====
While prostate cancer is usually treated with surgery, metronomic therapy may be useful in castration-resistant prostate cancer (CRPC) which is the stage of prostate cancer that does not respond to medical treatment anymore. Although docetaxel, a drug used as regimen was found to be effective in treatment of CRPC in 2004, using docetaxel caused serious side effects such as neuropathy and fatigue. This is undesirable especially when most patients with prostate cancer are old-aged. The response to newer medications, such as enzalutamide and abiraterone, is also variable. However, recent studies have found out that metronomic chemotherapy using cyclophosphamide was more beneficial with fewer side effects as the therapy uses smaller amount of regimens which cause severe side effects. Since metronomic chemotherapy was proven to be an effective alternative, studies to find about the most beneficial combination of regimens with fewest side effects need to be investigated.

==== Lung cancer ====
Metronomic therapy was discovered to be effective in treatment of lung cancer as well, especially in metastatic non-small-cell lung carcinoma (NSCLC). There are a variety of drugs used for cancer treatment. Vinorelbine is one of the drugs that are used for cancer treatment. Using vinorelbine as a regimen was shown to be feasible for very elderly patients who tend to have multiple comorbidities which is a condition that a patient has more than two diseases at a time, and require multiple medications but, the effect of metronomic therapy is not only limited to aged patients. Etoposide may also be effective in these frail patients. Although metastatic or recurrent lung cancer is difficult to be completely cured with modern medical technology, metronomic therapy is feasible as a palliative therapy by reducing tumor burden and improving patients' quality of life. Future research is expected to be experimenting effects of combinations with vinorelbine and other treatments.

==== Ovarian cancer ====
Metronomic therapy has been investigated for treatment of metastatic ovarian cancer as it is less costly and it improves patients' quality of lives compared to conventional therapy. It may also be useful in patients who have platinum-resistant ovarian cancer.

From 2012 to 2016, six ovarian cancer patients who could not be treated with conventional therapy were treated with metronomic cyclophosphamide. Although the clinical outcomes do not only depend on metronomic therapy but also previous treatments they had received, the treatment provided the progress of ovarian cancers and one case was found to have nearly complete clinical remission. Despite the encouraging results, there are not many clinical trials using metronomic therapy for ovarian cancer. Most of the findings are from case reports and pre-clinical trials. Due to few clinical trials and lack of information about the applications, it is still risky and questionable to substitute conventional therapy used in treatment of ovarian cancer.

=== Paediatric cancers ===
Paediatric cancers have been a challenge due to the expense of treatment. In fact, the cure rate in high-income countries and low-income countries are 80% and 10% respectively. Therefore, lowering the expense of paediatric cancers is a key to improve the quality of life worldwide. Metronomic therapy can be a good way to reduce the expense of cancer treatment. In terms of using metronomic therapy for paediatric cancers, it has been very effective as children have stronger immunity and tend to have fewer comorbidities compared to elderly cancer patients. Despite a few clinical trials, some trials still highlighted the effectiveness of metronomic therapy as well as cost-effectiveness.

== Limitations ==
The use of metronomic therapy is still of limited use and requires further evaluation. Currently, most of the clinical studies are phase I and II trials. There are only about ten studies which have proceeded to phase III.

=== Heterogeneity of studies ===
The studies are heterogeneous in terms of patient selection, chemotherapeutic agents, dosage and dosing interval. Correspondingly, the clinical outcomes are variable. Multiple reviews pointed out that further studies should be carried out to determine the most effective drugs, dosage and dosing interval according to tumor and patient characteristics.

=== Lack of promising biomarkers ===
Different biomarkers for monitoring the patients' response towards metronomic therapy have been tested, but the results showed that the biomarkers did not correlate well with the treatment response. Without proper biomarkers, it is difficult to determine the optimal metronomic dose for the patients.

Blood biomarkers related to angiogenesis, such as VEGF, TSP-1, circulating endothelial cells (CECs) and CEPs, have been tested. It was reviewed that most studies did not show a significant correlation between the level of these biomarkers and the treatment response, in terms of clinical outcomes such as overall survival and progression-free survival. This is likely due to the complex interplay of factors in angiogenesis.

Besides blood biomarkers, an imaging called dynamic contrast-enhanced MRI (DCE-MRI) has also been used. It assesses the tumor vascularity by measuring blood flow, fractional intravascular volume and other related parameters. However, as it only selects one or two portions of the tumor for measurement, it may not represent the overall vascularity and predict the response.

Biomarkers related to the immunomodulatory effects of metronomic therapy are also under investigation. The most commonly studied one is Tregs. With advances in technologies, not only the number of Tregs but also other properties such as receptor profile and functioning of Tregs can be studied, which may aid in finding more suitable biomarkers in the future.

== History ==
The term "metronomic therapy" was first used by Douglas Hanahan in 2000. In his commentary on two animal studies testing the effects of metronomic dosing of chemotherapeutic agents on tumor growth, he suggested that metronomic therapy was a potential new modality of chemotherapy with clinical value.

== See also ==
- Chemotherapy
