= Trevor Lawley =

Canadian scientist

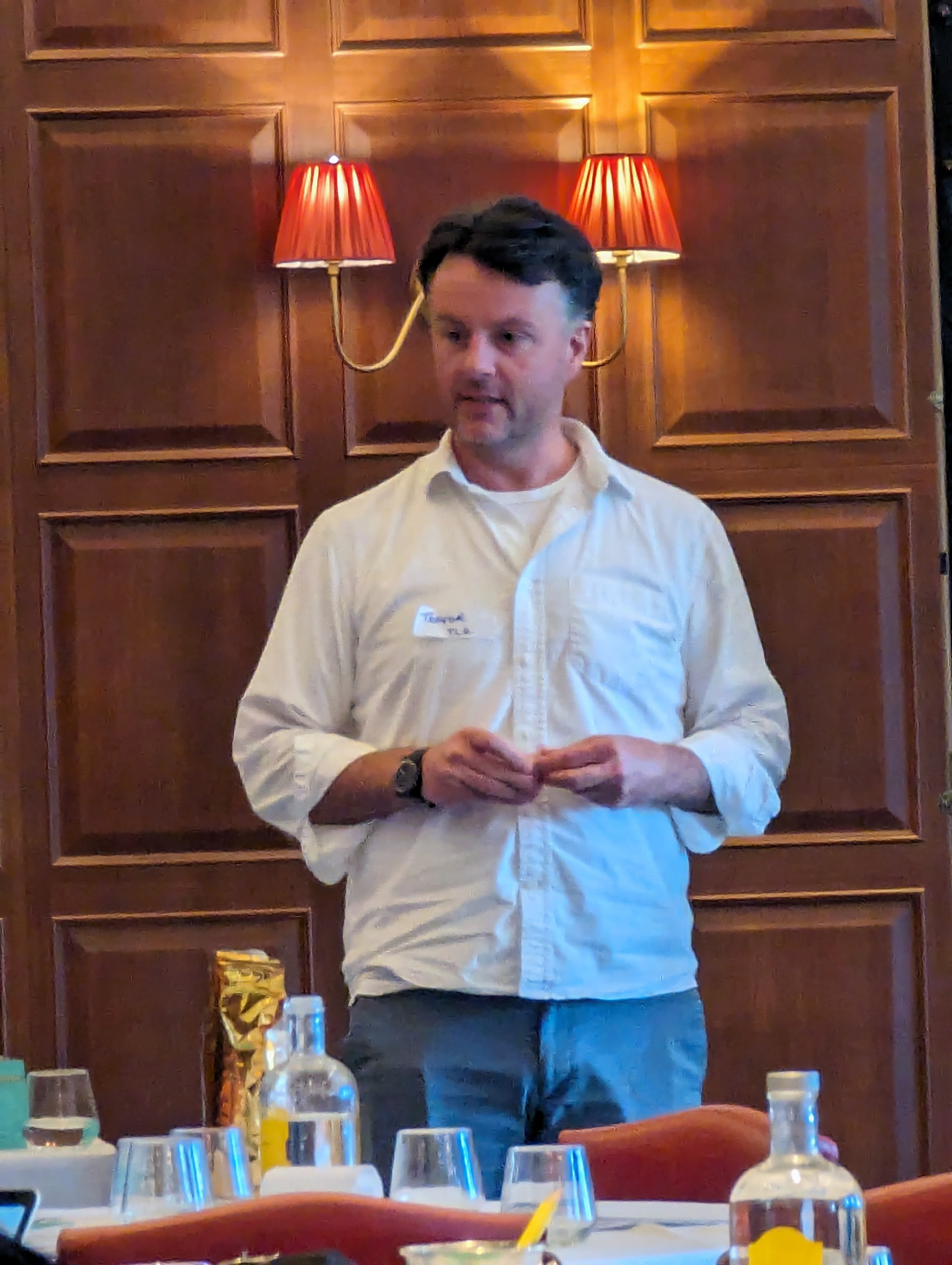
Image of Trevor Lawley

Trevor Lawley FMedSci is a Faculty member and Senior Group Leader in the Host-Microbiota Interactions Lab at the Wellcome Sanger Institute (WSI). He is also co-founder and Chief Scientific Officer of the biotech company Microbiotica.

During his career, Lawley has pioneered the application of high throughput genomic and culturing approaches to characterise enteric pathogens and investigate the microbiomes contained on and within host organisms, during periods of health and disease.

== Education and career ==
Lawley received his bachelor's degree in Biology in 1997 from Acadia University. He then studied for a PhD at the University of Alberta, in the laboratories of Diane Taylor and Laura Frost, where he studied the mechanisms that pathogenic bacteria use to disseminate antibiotic resistance genes. After his PhD, Trevor was awarded a Canadian Institutes of Health Research post-doctoral fellowship to work in the Laboratories of Stanley Falkow and Denise Monack at Stanford University, where he studied the impact of antibiotic treatment on Salmonella disease and transmission.

In 2007 Lawley received a Royal Society of London Award to start a research programme on Clostridioides difficile disease and transmission at the Wellcome Sanger Institute. In 2010, he was appointed as a Career Development Fellow in the Sanger Institute Faculty and was promoted to Faculty Group Leader in 2014 and a Senior Group Leader in 2021. Lawley chairs the Wellcome Sanger Institute International Fellows programme, which focuses on empowering scientists from Low- and Middle-Income Countries through access to cutting-edge genomic technologies and training.

In December 2016, Lawley, together with Gordon Dougan and Mike Romanos, co-founded the biotech company Microbiotica through £12M seed funding from Cambridge Innovation Capital, IP Group and Seventure. Microbiotica develops Live Biotherapeutic Products, biomarkers and microbiome-based technologies focused on autoimmune diseases and cancers. In 2018, Microbiotica entered into a collaboration with Genentech to discover, develop and commercialise inflammatory bowel disease (IBD)biomarkers, targets and medicines. In 2020, Microbiotica entered into a partnership with Cambridge University Hospitals and Cancer Research UK to discover and develop biomarkers and medicines for cancer immunotherapy patients with melanoma, renal cell carcinoma or lung cancer. In March 2022, Microbiotica secured Series B funding to perform two phase 1 clinical studies for treatment of patients with melanoma (MELODY-1, NCT06540391) or ulcerative colitis (COMPOSER-1, NCT06582264). The two clinical trials started in 2024.

== Research ==
Lawley leads the Host-Microbiota Interactions Lab at the Sanger Institute, which explores the relationship between humans and the bacteria and viruses that collectively form their microbiome.

Lawley and his team use a range of methods and tools, including large scale metagenomic analysis, genetics, mouse and cellular models, state-of-the art microbial culturing, transcriptomics, proteomics and machine learning, to investigate the microbial communities associated with human health and a range of developmental disorders, diseases and poorly understood syndromes. They have a particular interest the roles of the microbiome in infectious disease, autoimmune disease, cancer and childhood developmental disorders. Their work has pioneered concepts, analytical tools and methodologies that, through data- and hypothesis-driven approaches, have led to foundational discoveries and enabled translation of medicines and diagnostics from the human microbiome.

Lawley and his team overturned the "great plate count anomaly dogma", long held in microbial ecology, by demonstrating the majority of the human gut microbiota is culturable. This breakthrough involved bacterial culturing, biobanking and genome sequencing at scale, leading to the development of fast, affordable, yet sophisticated, high-resolution gut microbiome analysis. A major outcome of biobanking pure cultures has been experimental testing of biological hypotheses derived from metagenomic analysis, which moves the field towards studies of causation and enables the realisation of microbiome derived medicines.

They focus on several key areas including:

- Characterising the evolution of taxonomic and functional diversity in the human microbiome.
- Investigating the early-life microbiome, and how birth-mode and clinical interventions, impact microbiome acquisition and assembly.
- Understanding host-microbiome interactions and drivers of inflammatory disease and cancer.
- Studying the fundamental biology, transmission and pathogenesis of C. difficile.

Lawley's group has authored over 100 papers. Their work is regularly covered in the scientific and popular press.

== Awards and honours ==
Lawley was elected as a Fellow of the Academy of Medical Sciences in 2023. In 2015 Lawley received the Peggy Lillis Foundation "Innovator Award" for Pioneering Work on Live Biotherapeutics. In 2026 Lawley was elected as Fellow of the European Academy of Microbiology.
