= Living medicine =

Genetically engineered probiotics as living medicines for intestinal inflammation.(a) A beneficial strain of Escherichia coli is genetically modified to produce special protein fibers that carry therapeutic molecules. These fibers are released by the bacteria and assemble outside the cell.(b) The main fiber protein is engineered to include a therapeutic component that helps protect and heal the intestinal lining. (c) The engineered bacteria are grown in large quantities and then delivered to the gastrointestinal tract, where areas of intestinal inflammation are present.(d) In inflammatory bowel disease, damage to the intestinal lining allows harmful substances to trigger immune responses and worsen inflammation (left). Treatment with the engineered bacteria helps strengthen the intestinal barrier, support tissue repair, and reduce inflammation (right).

Microbial therapy (also known as microbial therapeutics) is the use of beneficial microorganisms to prevent, manage, or treat disease. These microorganisms can include bacteria, viruses, bacteriophages (viruses that infect bacteria), and fungi. Because they are alive, microbial therapeutics are sometimes referred to as living medicines.

Microbial therapeutics may consist of naturally occurring microorganisms or genetically engineered ones designed to perform specific medical functions. They can be administered directly to patients or used as delivery systems to release therapeutic substances inside the body.

Examples of microbial therapeutics include probiotics, live biotherapeutic products (LBPs), microbiome-based therapies, and phage therapy, which uses bacteriophages to target harmful bacteria. In addition, some microorganisms are engineered to produce medicines such as hormones or enzymes within the body. Microbes and viruses can also be used as carriers for drug delivery, diagnostics, or medical imaging.

Microbial therapeutics can act through several mechanisms. Some work by changing the composition or activity of the body’s microbiome, especially in the gut, which can influence digestion, metabolism, and immune function. Others interact directly with the immune system, either enhancing immune responses (for example, against cancer) or reducing harmful inflammation. Certain microbes can kill disease-causing organisms or compete with them for space and nutrients. Engineered microorganisms may also be designed to sense disease-related signals and release therapeutic molecules—such as enzymes, signaling proteins, or drugs—directly at the site where they are needed.

== Development of microbial therapeutics ==
Key considerations in designing engineered bacterial therapeutics.(a) Designing an engineered bacterial therapy involves choosing an appropriate bacterial strain, based on where it should act in the body, how it behaves after administration, and how easily it can be manufactured. Genetic circuits are designed to be stable, effective, and practical to use, while also considering patient needs.(b) Effective strain design balances good performance in the target environment with practical requirements for manufacturing and clinical use.

Schematic representation of a workflow for developing clinical candidate-quality engineered strains. The development workflow should incorporate technologies for optimizing strain potency, as well as predictive in vitro and in vivo assays, as well quantitative pharmacology models, to maximize translational potential for patient populations.

The development of microbial therapeutics is an active area of research in microbiology and synthetic biology. Researchers generally follow two main approaches. One approach focuses on identifying naturally occurring microorganisms that already have beneficial effects on human health and studying how they can be safely used as treatments. The second approach involves genetically engineering microorganisms to give them new or enhanced therapeutic functions, such as producing specific medicines inside the body or responding to changes in the disease environment.

Developing microbial therapeutics also involves addressing challenges related to safety, stability, and control. Scientists work to ensure that therapeutic microbes behave predictably, can be reliably manufactured, and remain effective without causing harm to patients.

== Applications of microbial therapeutics ==
=== Cancer therapy ===
Schematic of therapeutic bacteria strategies against hypoxic tumors

Bacteria-mediated antitumor immune responses. After entering the body, bacteria can accumulate in tumors and interact with cancer cells and the surrounding immune environment. These interactions can directly damage tumor cells and activate immune responses that support tumor shrinkage. Some bacteria release toxins that kill cancer cells, while others help immune cells recognize tumor antigens. This leads to activation of immune cells such as dendritic cells, CD8⁺ T cells, natural killer cells, and neutrophils, which work together to attack tumors. Bacterial signals can also reduce immune cells that suppress antitumor responses, further strengthening immune activity within the tumor.

Bacteria involved in causing and treating cancers

There is interest in using microbial therapeutics for cancer treatment. Some bacteria naturally grow well in low-oxygen environments, which are common inside tumors. These bacteria can move into tumors, remain there longer than many conventional treatments, and deliver therapeutic effects directly at the tumor site. Researchers are studying both natural and engineered bacteria that may slow tumor growth, stimulate immune responses against cancer, or work alongside existing cancer therapies.

=== Obesity and metabolic disorders ===
Microbial therapeutics are also being explored as treatments for obesity and metabolic diseases such as diabetes. Certain gut microorganisms influence how the body absorbs nutrients, stores energy, and regulates blood sugar. By changing the activity or composition of these microbes, it may be possible to improve metabolic health.

In addition, genetically engineered bacterial and yeast have been developed to produce hormones that help regulate appetite and glucose levels. For example, some engineered microbes release substances similar to the hormone glucagon-like peptide-1 (GLP-1), which supports insulin release and promotes feelings of fullness. Because these microbes can live in the gut, they may provide longer-lasting effects than traditional medications.

=== Inflammatory and immune-related diseases ===
Microbial therapeutics are being studied for the treatment of inflammatory and immune-related diseases, including inflammatory bowel disease (IBD), allergies, and autoimmune disorders. In these conditions, the immune system becomes overactive or poorly regulated, leading to chronic inflammation.

Certain microorganisms can help reduce inflammation by promoting immune balance. For example, some gut microbes produce molecules that calm inflammatory immune responses or support immune cells that help prevent excessive inflammation. Researchers are also developing engineered microorganisms that can release anti-inflammatory substances directly at sites of inflammation, which may reduce side effects compared with treatments that affect the entire body.

== Safety considerations ==
Because microbial therapeutics involve living organisms, safety is a key consideration in their development and use. Potential risks include uncontrolled growth of the microorganisms, unwanted interactions with the existing microbiome, or unexpected immune reactions. There are also concerns about the transfer of genetic material between microorganisms, which could affect other microbes in the body or the environment.

To reduce these risks, researchers use multiple safety strategies. One approach is biocontainment, which involves designing microorganisms so they can survive only under specific conditions. For example, engineered microbes may depend on nutrients that are only available during treatment or be programmed to self-destruct after a certain period of time. These strategies help limit how long the microorganisms persist and reduce the risk of unintended spread.

Additional safety measures include careful selection of microbial strains, extensive testing in laboratory and animal studies, and controlled clinical trials in humans. Regulatory agencies require thorough safety evaluations before microbial therapeutics can be approved for clinical use, with the goal of ensuring that these treatments are both effective and safe.
