= MSMB =

Animal protein produced in the prostate

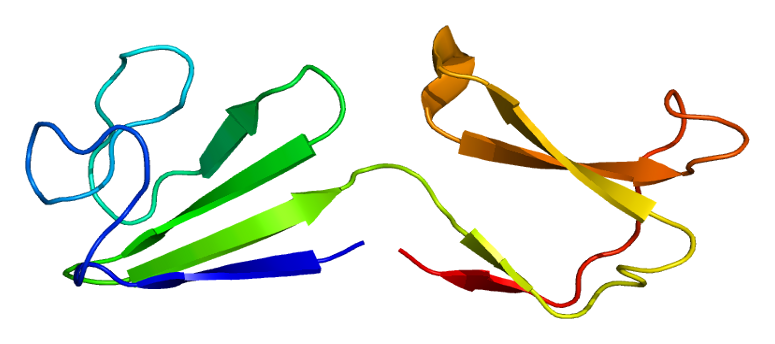
Available structures
PDB	Ortholog search: PDBe RCSB
PDB	List of PDB id codes 2IZ3, 3IX0

Identifiers
- Aliases: MSMB, HPC13, IGBF, MSP, MSPB, PN44, PRPS, PSP, PSP-94, PSP57, PSP94, microseminoprotein, beta-, microseminoprotein beta
- External IDs: OMIM: 157145; MGI: 97166; HomoloGene: 1832; GeneCards: MSMB; OMA:MSMB - orthologs

Gene location (Human)
Chr.	Chromosome 10 (human)
Band	10q11.22	Start	46,033,307 bp
Band	10q11.22	End	46,048,180 bp

Gene location (Mouse)
Chr.	Chromosome 14 (mouse)
Band	14|14 B	Start	31,863,980 bp
Band	14|14 B	End	31,880,327 bp
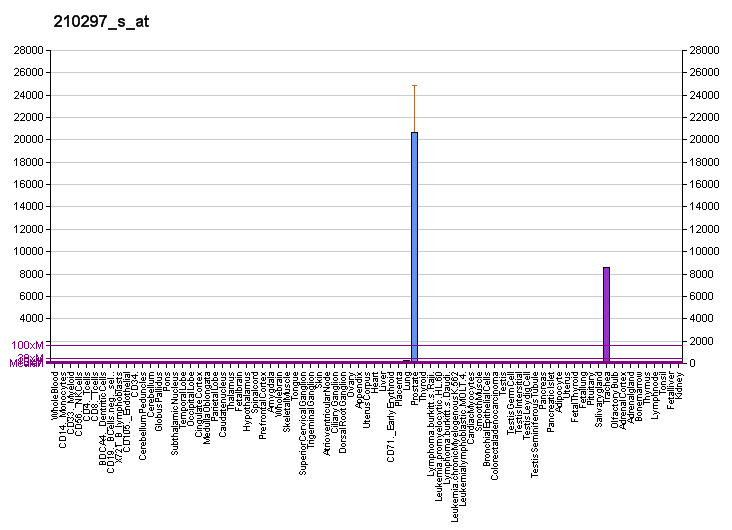

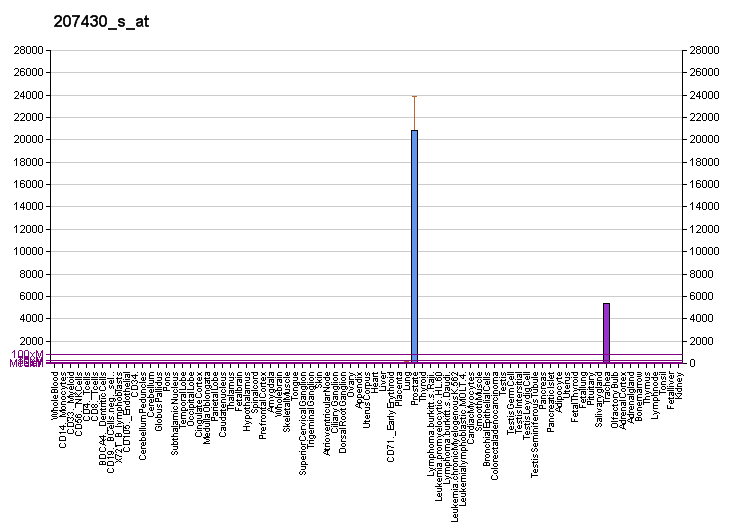
RNA expression pattern
Bgee	Human / Mouse (ortholog); Top expressed in: trachea; nasal epithelium; bronchial epithelial cell; olfactory zone of nasal mucosa; prostate; sperm; palpebral conjunctiva; epithelium of nasopharynx; mucosa of paranasal sinus; pylorus / Top expressed in: morula; blastocyst; embryo; embryo; white adipose tissue; choroid plexus of fourth ventricle; right kidney; exocrine gland; proximal tubule; hepatobiliary system; More reference expression data
BioGPS	More reference expression data
Gene ontology
Molecular function	protein binding; molecular function
Cellular component	extracellular region; nucleus; extracellular space
Biological process	biological process
Sources:Amigo / QuickGO
Orthologs
Species	Human	Mouse
Entrez	4477	17695
Ensembl	ENSG00000263639	ENSMUSG00000021907
UniProt	P08118	O08540
RefSeq (mRNA)	NM_138634; NM_002443	NM_020597
RefSeq (protein)	NP_002434; NP_619540	NP_065622
Location (UCSC)	Chr 10: 46.03 – 46.05 Mb	Chr 14: 31.86 – 31.88 Mb
PubMed search
- Wikidata
View/Edit Human	View/Edit Mouse

Beta-microseminoprotein is a protein that in humans is encoded by the MSMB gene. For historical reasons, the scientific literature may also refer to this protein as Prostate secretory protein 94 (PSP94), microseminoprotein (MSP), microseminoprotein-beta (MSMB), beta-inhibitin, prostatic inhibin peptide (PIP), and inhibitin like material (ILM).

== Distribution ==
MSMB is one of the three major proteins secreted by the epithelial cells of the prostate and has a concentration in seminal plasma of 0.5 to 1 mg/mL Two comprehensive studies of beta-microseminoprotein in tissue have shown that it is secreted by epithelial cells in many other organs: liver, lung, breast, kidney, colon, stomach, pancreas, esophagus, duodenum, salivary glands, fallopian tube, corpus uteri, bulbourethral glands and cervix. This list corresponds closely to the sites from which all late onset cancers develop.

== Evolution and structure ==
MSMB is a rapidly evolving protein. Solution structures of human and porcine MSMB show remarkable similarity despite having only 51% of amino acids in common. The C-terminus domain of MSMB contains two two-stranded β-sheets; these have no resemblance to other structural motifs. The rapid evolution of MSMB can be attributed to either sexual selection or innate pathogen defense; the wide distribution of MSMB in the body and the fungicidal properties of the C-terminus suggest that innate pathogen defense plays a role in driving this evolution.

== Function ==
Beta-microseminoprotein is a member of the immunoglobulin binding factor family. This protein has been reported to have inhibin-like properties, though this finding has been disputed. It may have a role as an autocrine and/or paracrine factor in uterine, breast, and other female reproductive tissues. Two alternatively spliced transcript variants encoding different isoforms are described for this gene. Despite having only 4 out of 11 amino acids in common, both the porcine and human fungicidal peptide on MSMB's C-terminus are potently fungicidal in the absence of calcium ions. The protein inhibits growth of cancer cells in an experimental model of prostate cancer, though this property is cell line–specific.

== Clinical significance ==
Two large genome-wide association studies showed that decreased expression of the MSMB protein caused by the rs10993994 single nucleotide polymorphism is associated with an increased risk of developing prostate cancer (odds ratio for CT allele pair ~1.2x, and for TT allele pair ~1.6x, when compared to the low risk CC allele pair). A 2003 study proposed using a truncated form of the MSMB protein called PSP61 as a biomarker for benign prostatic hyperplasia (BPH). This study found PSP61 in the expressed prostatic secretion of 10 out of 10 men suffering from BPH, while not finding it in 10 out of 10 age-matched BPH-free men. This truncated form of the MSMB protein lacks the fungicidal peptide identified in 2012. The expression of MSMB is found to be decreased in prostate cancer, so it may be usable as a biomarker for prostate cancer. Urinary MSMB has been found to be superior to urinary PSA at differentiating men with prostate cancer, at all Gleason grades.
