= Tumor-homing bacteria =

Tumor-homing bacteria are facultative or obligate anaerobic bacteria (capable of producing ATP when oxygen is absent or is destroyed in normal oxygen levels) that are able to target cancerous cells in the body, suppress tumor growth and survive in the body for a long time even after the infection. When this type of bacteria is administered into the body, it migrates to the cancerous tissues and starts to grow, and then deploys distinct mechanisms to destroy solid tumors. Each bacteria species uses a different process to eliminate the tumor. Some common tumor homing bacteria include Salmonella, Clostridium, Bifidobacterium, Listeria, and Streptococcus. The earliest research of this type of bacteria was highlighted in 1813 when scientists began observing that patients that had gas gangrene, an infection caused by the bacteria Clostridium, were able to have tumor regressions.

== Tumor-inhibition mechanisms ==
Different strains of tumor homing bacteria in distinct environments use unique or similar processes to inhibit or destroy tumor growth.

Mechanisms by which bacteria target tumors.

=== Unique mechanisms ===
- Salmonella bacteria kill tumor cells by uncontrolled bacterial multiplication that can lead to the bursting of cancerous cells. Moreover, the macrophages and dendritic cells (type of white blood cells) in these Salmonella-colonized tumors secrete IL-1β, a protein responsible for anti-tumor activity.
- S. Typhimurium flagellin increases both innate and adaptive immunity (nonspecific and specific defense mechanisms) of the bacteria by stimulating NK cells (Natural Killer cells) to produce interferon-γ (IFN-γ), an important cytokine (regulatory protein) for this immunity.
- Listeria inhibits tumors through NADPH oxidase mediated production (nicotinamide adenine dinucleotide phosphate oxidase) of ROS (reactive oxygen species) which is a cell signaling process that activates CD8+ T cells (cells that kill cancerous tissue) which target primary tumors.

=== Similar mechanisms ===
- Clostridium, S. Typhimurium, Listeria produce exotoxins (e.g. phospholipases, hemolysins, lipases) that damage the membrane structure and the cellular functions of the tumor using apoptosis or autophagy which is programmed cell death.
- Salmonella, Clostridium, and Listeria infections promote tumor elimination by increasing cytokines and chemokines (cell signaling regulatory proteins) that regulate infected sites using granulocytes and cytotoxic lymphocytes (WBC s that kill cancerous cells).

== Confirmed medical treatments ==
Bacterial cancer therapy is an emerging field for cancer treatment. Although many clinical trials are taking place, as of right now only a few confirmed treatments are being administered to patients.

=== Treatment with live strains of bacteria ===
- The usage of the live attenuated strain of Mycobacterium Bovis, also known as Bacillus Calmette-Guérin (BCG), is a confirmed treatment for bladder cancer. BCG therapy is done by intravesical instillation (drug administration into the urinary bladder via a catheter) and has been used since 1970 on cancer patients.
- Due to the necrotic and hypoxic regions of tumor cells (area of treatment resistance), drug delivery of chemotherapy can be impaired. Therefore Salmonella can be combined with chemotherapy to provide treatment and transport as Salmonella is not affected by these regions. Moreover, the Salmonella mutant strain VNP20009 increased in number from this combination which causes further inhibition of cancerous cells by stimulating anti-tumor proteins.

=== Treatment with genetically engineered bacteria ===
Tumor homing bacteria can be genetically engineered to enhance their anti-tumor activities and be used to transport therapeutic materials based on medical needs. They are usually transformed into a plasmid that contains the specific gene expression of these therapeutic proteins of the bacteria. After the plasmid reaches the target site, the protein's genetic sequence is expressed and the bacteria can have its full biological effect. Currently, there is no approved treatment with genetically engineered bacteria. However, research is being conducted on Listeria and Clostridium as vectors to transport RNAi (suppresses genes) for colon cancer.

== Safety ==
Some active tumor-homing bacteria can be harmful to the human body, since they produce toxins that disturb the cell cycle which results in altered cell growth and chronic infections. However, many ways to enhance the safety of tumor homing bacteria in the body has been found. For example, when the virulent genes of the bacteria are removed by gene targeting, a process where genes are deleted or modified, it can be reduced in pathogenicity (property of causing disease).

=== Adverse effects ===
- DNA mutations of the tumor homing bacteria in the body can lead to problems like extreme infection and failure of therapy as the genes that are expressed will be different and cause the bacteria to become non-functional.
- Incomplete tumor lysis or colonization by the bacteria can lead to delayed treatment and will necessitate the use of other cancer treatments such as chemotherapy or a combination of more. Delayed or combined treatment causes many effects on the body such as vomiting, nausea, loss of appetite, fatigue, and hair loss.

=== Prevention of adverse effects ===
- Deleting the msbB gene from Salmonella by genetic engineering leads to the loss of lipid A (a lipid responsible for the toxicity levels of gram-negative bacteria) and therefore reduces the toxicity of Salmonella by 10,000-fold.
- Generating auxotrophic mutants (a strain of microorganism that will proliferate only when the medium is supplemented with some specific substance) that cannot replicate efficiently in an environment where a particular nutrient required by the mutant strain is scarce. Salmonella A1-R represents such a strain, which is auxotrophic for the amino acids leucine and arginine that are enriched in the tumor but not in normal tissues. Therefore, in the tumor, Salmonella A1-R will grow but not in the normal tissues thereby preventing infections and increasing safety.

== Research ==
The most researched bacteria for cancer therapy are Salmonella, Listeria, and Clostridium. A genetically engineered strain of Salmonella (TAPET-CD) has completed phase 1 clinical trials for patients with stage 4 metastatic cancer. Listeria-based cancer vaccines are currently being produced and are undergoing many clinical trials. Phase I trials of the Clostridium strain called Clostridium novyi (C. novyi-NT) for patients with treatment-refractory tumors or tumors that are unresponsive to treatment is currently underway.

== See also ==
- Gene targeting
- Chemotherapy
- Immunotherapy
- BCG Vaccine
- Virotherapy
