= Tumor-associated endothelial cell =

A visualization of tumor-associated blood vessels in the human breast

Tumor-associated endothelial cells or tumor endothelial cells (TECs) refers to cells lining the tumor-associated blood vessels that control the passage of nutrients into surrounding tumor tissue. Across different cancer types, tumor-associated blood vessels have been discovered to differ significantly from normal blood vessels in morphology, gene expression, and functionality in ways that promote cancer progression. There has been notable interest in developing cancer therapeutics that capitalize on these abnormalities of the tumor-associated endothelium to destroy tumors.

== Abnormal morphology ==
Tumor endothelial cells (TECs) have been documented to demonstrate abnormal morphological characteristics such as ragged margins and irregular cytoplasmic projections. In normal blood vessels, it is known that endothelial cells form regular monolayers with tight junctions without overlap, but TECs create disorganized and loosely connected monolayers, often branching and extending across the lumen to overlap with their neighbors. In addition to this, TECs are showing distinct molecular signature which clearly separates them from physiological endothelial cells. The tumor endothelium is often described as mosaic due to its aberrant expression of traditional endothelial cell markers (CD31 and CD105), supporting the existence of irregular gaps between endothelial cells. At a more macro level, beyond the observation of small intercellular openings between nearby TECs, larger gaps in the walls of tumor blood vessels have been described.

=== Causes of abnormalities ===
Many tumors are characterized by high expression of vascular endothelial growth factor (VEGF), which is a strong vasodilator. VEGF has been indicated to stimulate sprouting and tip branching in endothelial cells, leading to defective endothelial monolayers. Research supports that compression of tumor vessels by surrounding tumor cells results in mechanical tension and changes in blood flow. It has been suggested that these flow-mediated changes cause abnormal expression of transcription factors which promotes aberrant endothelial morphology, size, and differentiation.

Smaller capillaries are often surrounded by supporting pericytes which help with vessel stability. Loss of pericyte growth factor (PDGFB) and its receptor on endothelial cells are molecular-level changes that can account for this abnormal loss in pericyte support. Lower quantity of pericytes surrounding the tumor-associated endothelium has been associated with blood vessel instability and leakiness.

== Abnormal function ==
=== Blood vessel leakiness ===
Where these branched tumor-associated endothelial cells form small gaps in the blood vessel wall, erythrocytes often pool and form blood lakes. These cellular openings contribute to tumor vessel "leakiness", potentially allowing the entry and delivery of therapeutic agents to tumor sites. For many tumors, it has been discovered associated endothelial cells have significantly increased permeability.

=== Enhanced permeability and retention (EPR) effect ===
Illustration of the Enhanced Permeation and Retention (EPR) effect of macromolecular structures as drug delivery systems in malignant tissue.

The increased permeability of tumor-associated endothelial cells permits macromolecules to leave the blood system and directly enter the tumor interstitial space. There is also a retention effect that allows these macromolecules to stay at tumor sites due to the suppression of lymphatic infiltration. This observation has been termed the enhanced permeability and retention (EPR) effect and has been exploited for cancer nano-therapeutics. Unfortunately the effectiveness of this mechanism for drug nano-carriers remains inconsistent due to the heterogeneity of this EPR effect within and amongst different tumors. Tumor type, size, and location affect the nature of the surrounding vasculature and stroma and contribute to this heterogeneity in EPR effect.

== Roles in tumor progression ==
=== Angiogenesis ===
The idea of tumors promoting angiogenesis, or the process of forming new blood vessels, has been around since the discovery of VEGF in 1989. The branching patterning of tumor-associated endothelial cells has been implicated in the initiation of angiogenesis. Dr. Judah Folkman played an important role in studying the role of angiogenesis in promoting tumor growth. He identified tumor's response to hypoxia as a leading contributor to angiogenesis and cancer growth.

Angiogenesis was originally introduced as a Hallmark of Cancer based on assumptions that the underlying processes were similar amongst different tumor types. However, there are now multiple studies that illustrate the complexity behind these previous simple conceptions of angiogenesis, indicating that the way cancer cells interact with and co-opt new blood vessel growth varies amongst cancer types and must be studied. This must be studied in order to improve clinical design strategy and select for patients with tumors that are more likely to benefit from anti-angiogenic drugs.

==== Angiogenesis inhibitors ====
Various angiogenesis inhibitors have been developed to interfere with different steps in the process. Bevacizumab (Avastin) is a monoclonal antibody that binds to VEGF, preventing the stimulation of the VEGF receptor. Sorafenib and sutinib are additional angiogenesis inhibitors that bind and block receptors on endothelial cells that have important roles in downstream pathways contributing to angiogenesis progression. An extensive amount of other compounds targeted towards halting angiogenesis are either currently in preclinical development, undergoing clinical trials, or in the process of getting approved by the United States Food and Drug Administration.

=== Immune suppression ===
Immune therapies depend heavily on the abilities of effector lymphocytes to infiltrate tumors, and the tumor endothelium is a known crucial regulator of T-cell trafficking. The tumor-associated endothelium has been found to be able to function as an immune barrier to T-cells, inhibiting the effectiveness of immune therapies. These tumor-associated endothelial cells have been found to over-express the endothelin B receptor, which suppresses T-cell adhesion and targeting to tumors upon activation by ET-1.

=== Metastasis ===
The vasculature can promote metastasis by capturing cancer cells at their primary sites and providing for their delivery to secondary organs. These tumor-associated endothelial cells can also release factors and supply nutrients that promote the growth of the primary tumor mass and its aggressive spread. Additionally, angiogenesis is intimately linked to metastasis, as delivery of nutrients and oxygen through blood vessels is required for invasive tumor growth and spread.

== See also ==
- Tumor microenvironment
- Angiogenesis
- Endothelium
