= Tumor microenvironment =

Surroundings of tumors including nearby cells and blood vessels

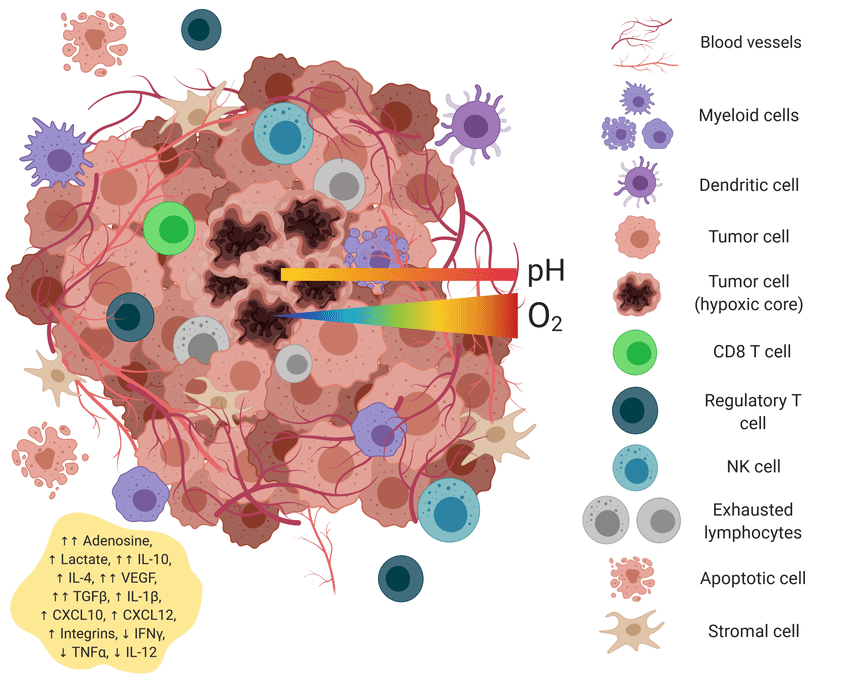
Component of the tumor microenvironment (TME). The tumor microenvironment is a complex system of various tumor cells, stromal cells, and immune cells.

The tumor microenvironment is a complex ecosystem surrounding a tumor, composed of cancer cells, stromal tissue (including blood vessels, immune cells, fibroblasts and signaling molecules) and the extracellular matrix. Mutual interaction between cancer cells and the different components of the tumor microenvironment support its growth and invasion in healthy tissues which correlates with tumor resistance to current treatments and poor prognosis. The tumor microenvironment is in a constant state of change because of the tumor's ability to influence the microenvironment by releasing extracellular signals, promoting tumor angiogenesis and inducing peripheral immune tolerance, while the immune cells in the microenvironment can affect the growth and evolution of cancerous cells.

== History ==
The concept of the tumor microenvironment (TME) dates back to 1863 when Rudolf Virchow established a connection between inflammation and cancer. However, it was not until 1889 that Stephen Paget's seed and soil theory introduced the important role of TME in cancer metastasis, highlighting the intricate relationship between tumors and their surrounding microenvironment. The theory indicated that cancer cells have tendencies when spreading. Paget proposed that the metastases of a particular type of cancer ("the seed") often metastasizes to certain sites ("the soil") based on the similarity of the original and secondary tumor sites. In other words, just as seeds need fertile soil to grow, cancer cells require a supportive microenvironment to metastasize.

In 1928, James Ewing challenged Paget's theory with his own perspective on cancer metastasis. Ewing proposed that the ability of cancer cells to metastasize was primarily influenced by mechanical mechanisms such as anatomical and hemodynamic factors of the vascular connection, with tumor cells more likely to be trapped in the first connected organ. This viewpoint suggested that certain properties or mutations within cancer cells might dictate their metastatic potential, independent of the surrounding tissue environment. Isaiah Fidler formulated a complementary hypothesis in the 1970s, where he proposed that while the mechanical aspects of blood flow is important, metastatic colonization specifically targets certain organs, known as organotropism.

In the late 1970s, attention shifted towards understanding the role of lymphocytes within the tumor microenvironment. Reports emerged detailing the presence and activities of tumor-infiltrating T and B lymphocytes, as well as natural killer (NK) cells. Researchers observed that tumor-infiltrating T cells had both anti-tumor cytotoxicity and immune-suppressive properties. However, their cytotoxic activity was found to be lower compared to lymphocytes from distant sites, likely due to the overall immunosuppressive state in tumor-bearing individuals.

== Vasculature ==
A tumor's vasculature is important to its growth, as blood vessels deliver oxygen, nutrients, and growth factors to the tumor. Tumors smaller than 1–2 mm in diameter are delivered oxygen and nutrients through passive diffusion. In larger tumors the center becomes too far away from the existing blood supply, leading the tumor microenvironment to become hypoxic and acidic. Angiogenesis is upregulated to feed the cancer cells and is linked to tumor malignancy.

=== Endothelial cells and angiogenesis ===
In hypoxic environments the tissue sends out signals called hypoxia inducible factors (HIFs) that can stimulate nearby endothelial cells to secrete factors such as vascular endothelial growth factor (VEGF). VEGF activates the endothelial cells, which begins the process of angiogenesis, where new blood vessels emerge from pre-existing vasculature. The blood vessel formed in the tumor environment often does not mature properly, and as a result the vasculature formed in the tumor microenvironment differs from that of normal tissue. The blood vessels formed are often "leaky" and tortuous, with a compromised blood flow. As tumors cannot grow large without proper vasculature, sustained angiogenesis is therefore considered one of the hallmarks of cancer.

In later stages of tumor progression endothelial cells can differentiate into carcinoma associated fibroblasts, which furthers metastasis.

=== Enhanced permeability and retention effect ===
The enhanced permeability and retention effect is the observation that the vasculature of tumors tend to accumulate macromolecules in the blood stream to a greater extent than in normal tissue. This is due to the "leaky" nature of the vasculature around tumors, and a lacking lymphatic system. The permeable vasculature allows for easier delivery of therapeutic drugs to the tumor, and the lacking lymphatic vessels contribute to an increased retention. The permeable vasculature is thought to have several causes, including insufficient pericytes and a malformed basement membrane.

=== Hypoxia ===
Tumor stroma and extracellular matrix in hypoxia

While angiogenesis can reduce the hypoxia in the tumor microenvironment, the partial pressure of oxygen is below 5 mmHg in over 50% of locally advanced solid tumors, compared to venous blood which has a partial pressure of oxygen at 40-60 mmHg. A hypoxic environment leads to genetic instability by downregulating genes involved in DNA repair mechanisms such as nucleotide excision repair and mismatch repair pathways. This genetic instability leads to a high number of mutated cells, and is associated with cancer progression. Periods of mild and acute hypoxia and reoxygenation can lead cancer cells to adapt and grow into more aggressive phenotypes.

Hypoxia causes the upregulation of hypoxia induced factors (HIFs), which are transcription factors that decides how cells respond to a lack of oxygen. HIFs induces the transcription of thousands of genes, some of which induces angiogenesis or furthers metastasis, leading, for instance, to increased cell migration and matrix remodeling. An increased HIF expression can lead tumor cells to shift their metabolism from aerobic to anaerobic, where they obtain energy through glycolysis. Cells with an elevated glucose metabolism produce lactate, which decreases the pH in the microenvironment from a neutral and healthy 7.35-7.45 to an acidic 6.3-7.0. This phenomenon is described as the "Warburg effect". HIFs also regulate immune cells, and an increased expression can lead to the inactivation of anti-tumor functions. This furthers the survival of tumor cells and hinders anti-tumor treatment.

== Stromal cells ==
Cancer is a complex disease involving both tumor cells and surrounding stromal cells. In cancer biology, the stroma is defined as the nonmalignant cells found in the supportive tissue surrounding tumors. These cells include fibroblasts, immune cells, endothelial cells, and various other cell types.

Stromal cells within the tumor microenvironment represent an important cellular component in cancer development, influencing tumor metabolism, growth, metastasis, immune evasion, and resistance to chemotherapy. These cells can originate from neighboring non-cancerous stromal cells or undergo transdifferentiation from tumor cells. Stromal cells contribute to tumor initiation, progression and drug resistance, and the stroma is known to evolve as the tumor develops. Understanding the interactions between cancer cells and stromal cells is essential for developing effective cancer treatments. Alterations in the stroma, including the activation of fibroblasts into carcinoma-associated fibroblasts (CAFs) and remodeling of the extracellular matrix (ECM), are recognized as important in cancer progression and potential targets for therapy and diagnosis.

=== Carcinoma-associated fibroblasts ===
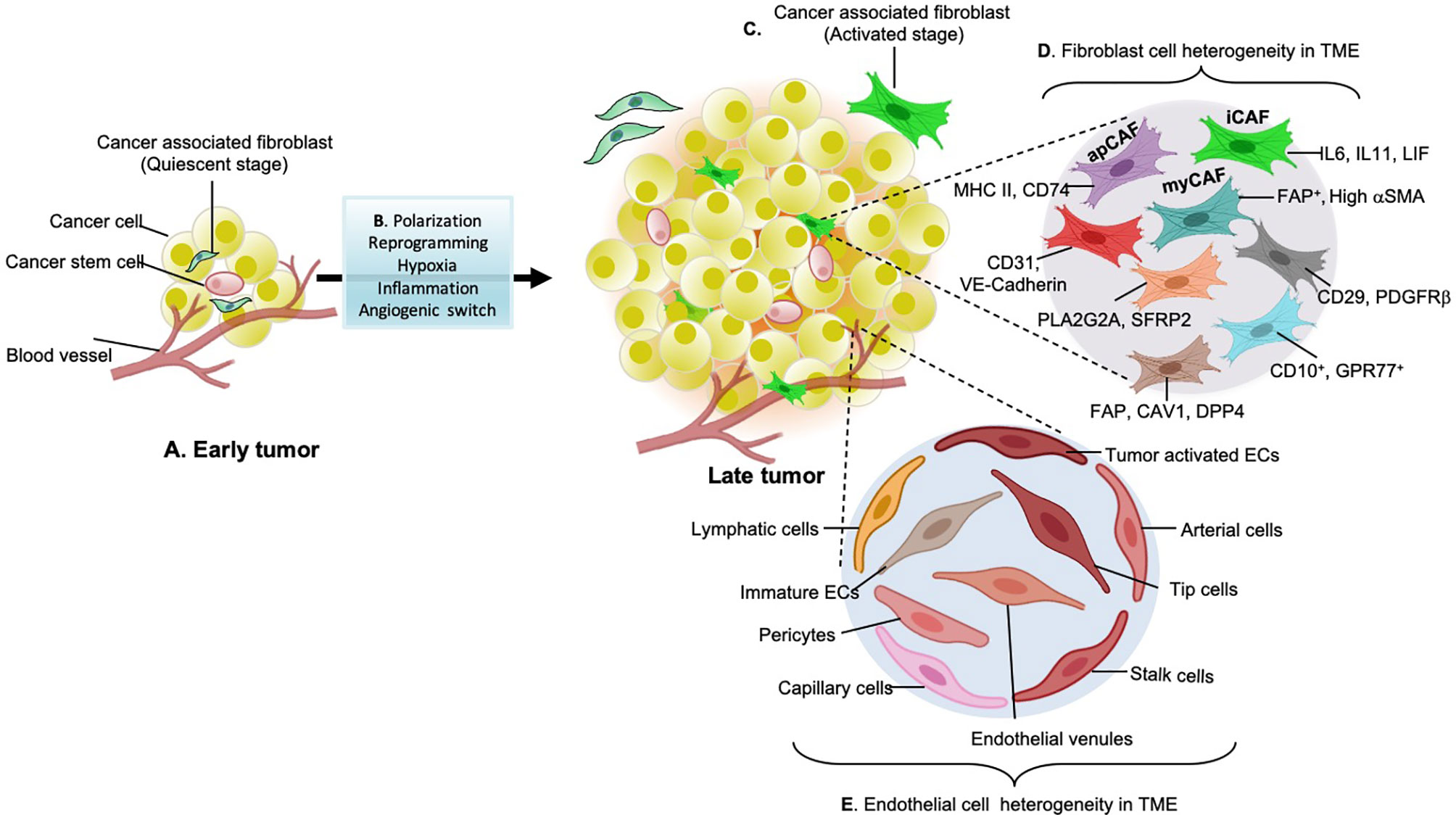
Stromal cell types in early and late-stage tumors.

Carcinoma-associated fibroblasts (CAFs) are a heterogenous group of activated fibroblasts central to the reactive stroma within the tumor microenvironment. The precise definition of CAFs remains challenging due to variations in cellular origins and expression markers. However, evidence suggests CAFs originate from activated resident fibroblasts, bone marrow-derived mesenchymal stem cells (MSCs), cancer cells undergoing epithelial-mesenchymal transition (ETM), or endothelial cells through endothelial to mesenchymal transition (EndMT).

CAFs are one of the most common components of the tumor stroma and are particularly found in the interstitial spaces of breast, prostate, and pancreatic cancer. They interact with cancer cells by secreting a variety of extracellular matrix components or cell-cell adhesion, which is important in regulating the biological behavior of tumors. These regulations are particularly important for tumor development and influence cancer cell growth, invasion, inflammation, and angiogenesis. CAFs may also exhibit tumor-inhibitory properties in some cases.

CAFs play a dual role in tumorigenesis; one that promotes tumor growth and another that inhibits it, with the former being more common and contributing to tumor development and therapy resistance through various mechanisms. Various subpopulations of CAFs have been identified across different cancer types. In breast cancer, for example, studies using single-cell RNA sequencing have revealed distinct phenotypes, including vascular CAFs, matrix CAFs, cycling CAFs, and developmental CAFs. Studies using proteomic analysis and single-cell RNA sequencing have shed more light on the diverse characteristics of CAFs, revealing distinct and sometimes contradictory functions. Their functions appear to be context dependent. This diversity in stomal composition not only shapes the tumor microenvironment, but also affects the behavior of tumor cells.

Targeting CAF has emerged as a promising strategy for improving cancer treatment, but the research faces several challenges. These include gaps in our understanding of CAF origins and their diverse functions, some of which may be helpful in combating tumors.

=== Extracellular matrix remodeling ===
HIF regulates cancer cells

The extracellular matrix (ECM) is a three-dimensional network of proteins and proteoglycans in the microenvironment and is present in all tissue. The ECM is a highly dynamic structure and is essential for tissue development, repair, support, and homeostasis. In healthy skin, the EMC is composed of various molecules such as collagens, glycoproteins, and glycosaminoglycans that regulate functions and mechanical properties. However, in tumors, the ECM plays an important role in shaping the tumor microenvironment and influences cancer progression, metastasis, and therapeutic response. This process is called extracellular matrix remodeling and is characterized by changes in protein content and enzymatic activity which influences signal transduction and cell-matrix alterations. ECM remodeling involves dynamic alterations in ECM composition, organization, and biomechanical properties, leading to changes in the elastic modulus of the cellular microenvironment. ECM remodeling is induced by factors such as hypoxia, acidosis, inflammatory cells, or proteases secreted by tumor or stromal cells.

==== Cellular mechanisms ====
Cells interact with and bind to the ECM through transmembrane receptors like integrins, discoidin domain receptor 2 (DDRs), and syndecans. The transmission of signals from the ECM to the cell interior involves various pathways. One primary way is direct transduction mediated by transmembrane proteins like integrins. Integrins is the most studied ECM binding receptor and mediate ECM remodeling and regular cellular processes like proliferation, survival, migration, and invasion in response to ECM changes. They act as mechanotransducers by converting mechanical forces from the ECM or the cytoskeleton into chemical signals. Integrins can sense differences between simple, rigid two-dimensional surfaces and complex, malleable three-dimensional environments, altering cellular signaling accordingly.

In addition to integrins, other cell receptors like cell surface glycoprotein receptor (CD44), DDR2 and elastin-binding protein receptor (EBPR) can activate signaling pathways such as phosphatidylinositol 3-kinase and Akt. These receptors interact with various ECM components and create diverse cellular processes that contribute both to normal physiological functions and pathological conditions like cancer.

==== Impact on cancer progression ====
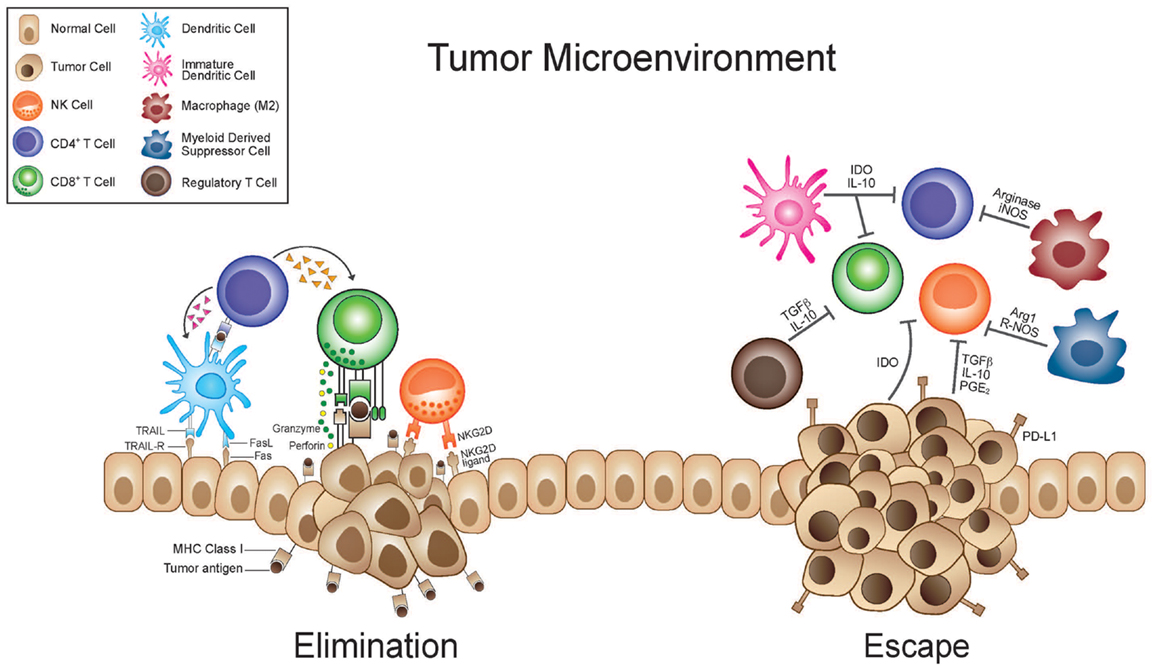
Multiple factors determine whether tumor cells will be eliminated by the immune system or will escape detection.

While ECM remodeling is tightly regulated under normal physiological conditions, it also modulates many of the tumor cell behaviors associated with cancer progression. This includes evasion of apoptosis, sustained angiogenesis, limitless replication potential, and tissue invasion. In cancer, changes in the ECM dynamics lead to changes in composition, density, and mechanical properties, affecting tumor aggressiveness and response to therapy. Research suggests that both pro- and anti-tumorigenic effects occurs during ECM remodeling. In early tumor formation, stromal cells produce excess ECM proteins, causing the tissue around the tumor to stiffen. Some of the contributing factors to tumor stiffness is increased type 1 collagen and acid deposition. Additionally, the restructured ECM and its degradation fragments (matrikines) impacts signaling pathways via cell-surface receptor interactions, leading to dysregulated stromal cell behavior and the emergence of an oncogenic microenvironment.

== Immune cells ==
Tumor-associated immune cells can be tumor-antagonizing or tumor-promoting, meaning that they can suppress or promote tumor growth. Because of the effects of hypoxia, the anti-tumor abilities of many tumor-antagonizing immune cells, such as cytotoxic T cells and natural killer cells, become inhibited. Tumor-promoting immune cells such as regulatory T cells and myeloid derived suppressor cells will, on the other hand, become upregulated.

Tumor-associated immune cells in the tumor microenvironment (TME) of breast cancer models

Immune checkpoints of immunosuppressive actions associated with breast cancer

=== Myeloid-derived suppressor cells and tumor-associated macrophages ===
Myeloid-derived suppressor cells are a heterogeneous population of cells of myelogenous origin that are considered tumor promoting. They have the potential to repress T cell responses, can support angiogenesis by producing proteins such as vascular endothelial growth factor (VEGF), and can promote metastasis. Tumor associated macrophages with the M2 phenotype are considered myeloid-derived suppressor cells.

Tumor-associated macrophages are a central component in the strong link between chronic inflammation and cancer, and are recruited to the tumor as a response to cancer-associated inflammation. Their sluggish NF-κB activation allows for the smoldering inflammation seen in cancer. Unlike normal macrophages, tumor-associated macrophages lack cytotoxic activity. Monocyte derived macrophages are divided into inflammatory M1-polarized macrophages and anti-inflammatory M2-polarized macrophages. M1-polarized macrophages phagocytize tumor cells and are considered tumor-antagonizing. M2-polarized macrophages are, on the other hand, tumor-promoting, because they promote tumor progression by suppressing immunosurveillance, aiding angiogenesis by secreting vascular endothelial growth factor (VEGF) and remodeling the extracellular matrix. The tumor microenvironment promotes the M2-polarized macrophages, and an increased amount of tumor-associated macrophages is associated with worse prognosis.

Tumor-associated macrophages are associated with using exosomes to deliver invasion-potentiating microRNA into cancerous cells, specifically breast cancer cells.

=== Neutrophils ===
Neutrophils are polymorphonuclear immune cells that are critical components of the innate immune system. Neutrophils can accumulate in tumors and in some cancers, such as lung adenocarcinoma. Their abundance at the tumor site is associated with worsened disease prognosis. Neutrophil numbers (and myeloid cell precursors) in the blood can be increased in some patients with solid tumors.

Experiments in mice have mainly shown that tumor-associated neutrophils exhibit tumor-promoting functions, but a smaller number of studies show that neutrophils can also inhibit tumor growth. Tumor associated neutrophils can be divided into N1- and N2-polarized neutrophils. N1-polarized neutrophils accumulate in the tumor in its early stages and support with tumor cell death. In later stages N2-polarized neutrophils promotes angiogenesis by secreting vascular endothelial growth factor (VEGF).

=== Tumor infiltrating lymphocytes ===
Tumor-infiltrating lymphocytes are lymphocytes, including T cells, B cells and natural killer cells, that penetrate the tumor and have the ability to recognize and kill cancer cells. A high concentration is generally positively correlated with good prognosis (802). This type of immune cells can also block metastasis, as natural killer cells are most efficient at killing cancer cells outside of the tumor microenvironment. Tumor-infiltrating lymphocytes have been used in therapeutic treatments, where lab-amplificated immune cells are transferred to cancer patients to help their immune system fight the cancer. This treatment has seen success in solid tumors such as melanoma.

Tumor-infiltrating lymphocytes can become tumor-promoting due to the immunosuppressive mechanisms of the tumor microenvironment. Cancer cells induce apoptosis of activated T cells by secreting exosomes containing death ligands such as FasL and TRAIL, and via the same method, turn off the normal cytotoxic response of natural killer cells.

=== T cells ===
There are several types of T cells that are important to tumorigenesis, including cytotoxic T cells (CD8+), T helper 1 (Th-1) cells and regulatory T cells (Tregs). CD8+ cells are tumor-antagonizing cells that recognize tumor antigens and targets cancer cells for destruction. In addition, CD8+ cells slow tumor progression and suppress angiogenesis by releasing interferon-gamma (IFN-γ). Th-1 cells supports the activation and proliferation of CD8+ cells by secreting IFN-γ and interleukin-2 (IL-2), and by cross-presenting tumor antigens. Tregs are, as opposed to CD8+, tumor promoting. They secrete tumor growth factors, and indirectly support cancer survival by interacting with endothelial cells and carcinoma associated fibroblasts. Tregs also have immunosuppressive mechanisms that can make CD8+ cells less effective.

T cells reach tumor sites via the vascular system, where the tumor microenvironment appears to preferentially recruit other immune cells over T cells. One such discriminating mechanism is the release of cell-type specific chemokines. Another is the expression of the apoptosis inducer Fas ligand (FasL) in the vasculature of ovarian, colon, prostate, breast, bladder and renal tumors. Tumors with a high expression of FasL has been shown to contain an abundancy of Tregs, but few CD8+ cells.

T cells must replicate after arriving at the tumor site to effectively kill the cancer cells, survive hostile elements and migrate through the stroma to the cancer cells. This is affected by the tumor microenvironment. The draining lymph nodes are the likely location for cancer specific T cell replication, although this also occurs within the tumor.

== Research ==
=== Models ===
Several in vitro and in vivo models have been developed that seek to replicate the TME in a controlled environment. Tumor immortalised cell lines and primary cell cultures have been long used in order to study various tumors. They are quick to set up and inexpensive, but simplistic and prone to genetic drift. 3D tumor models have been developed as a more spatially representative model of the TME. Spheroid cultures, scaffolds and organoids are generally derived from stem cells or ex vivo and are much better at recreating the tumour architecture than 2D cell cultures. Moreover, organ-on-chip technologies have been developed to more accurately replicate the tumor microenvironment by reproducing key structural and physicochemical features in controlled microfluidic systems. These platforms can emulate aspects such as tissue architecture, fluid flow, and gradients of oxygen, nutrients, and signaling molecules, enabling more physiologically relevant studies of tumor–stroma interactions and cancer progression

=== Human germline genetic variants and tumor microenvironment ===
Recent research has demonstrated that human germline genetic variants can significantly influence the composition of the tumor microenvironment. These germline variants affect the number of infiltrating CD8 T cells and regulatory T cells within tumors, thereby impacting immune evasion and responses to immunotherapy. Notably, studies published in the Journal of Clinical Investigation and Nature Communications have highlighted the role of STAT3-enhancing germline mutations and other common genetic variants in modulating the tumor immune landscape and driving therapeutic outcomes.

=== Drug development ===
Advancements in remodeling nanotherapeutics have led to progress in suppressing cancer metastasis and reducing the likelihood of cancer occurrence. Strategies included regulation of hypoxia, angiogenesis, cancer-associated fibroblasts (CAFs), extracellular matrix (ECM), and tumor-associated macrophages. These approaches aimed to improve anti-tumor effects and sensitize other therapies. Researchers have discovered that the use of ferumoxytol suppresses tumor growth by inducing transition of macrophages to proinflammatory types. Nanocarrier vehicles (~20–200 nm in diameter) can transport drugs and other therapeutic molecules. These therapies can be targeted to selectively extravasate through tumor vasculature. These efforts include protein capsids and liposomes. However, as some important, normal tissues, such as the liver and kidneys, also have fenestrated endothelium, the nanocarrier size (10–100 nm, with greater retention in tumors seen in using larger nanocarriers) and charge (anionic or neutral) must be considered. Lymphatic vessels do not usually develop with the tumor, leading to increased interstitial fluid pressure, which may block tumor access.

=== Therapies ===
==== Antibodies ====
Bevacizumab is clinically approved in the US to treat a variety of cancers by targeting VEGF-A, which is produced by both carcinoma associated fibroblasts and tumor-associated macrophages, thus slowing angiogenesis. It was initially approved for metastatic colorectal cancer, but its uses now span various cancers.

Targeting immunoregulatory membrane receptors succeeded in some patients with melanoma, non-small-cell lung carcinoma, urothelial bladder cancer and renal cell cancer. In mice, anti-CTLA-4 therapy leads to clearance from the tumor of FOXP3^{+} regulatory T cells (Tregs) whose presence may impair effector T cell function.

==== Kinase inhibitors ====
Mutated kinases are common in cancer cells, making them attractive targets for anticancer drugs. Kinase inhibitors are potent, specific and target abnormal kinases while minimizing toxicity. Kinase inhibitors have expanded treatment options for various cancers.

Tyrosine kinase inhibitors (TKIs), such as erlotinib, lapatinib, and gefitinib, target epidermal growth factor receptors (EGFRs) in cancer by blocking the activity of protein tyrosine kinases (PTKs). This show promise in modulating the tumor microenvironment, resulting in cancer regression. Understanding how TKIs modulates the tumor microenvironment may offer another form of cancer treatment.

===== Chimeric antigen receptor cell therapy =====
Chimeric antigen receptors (CAR) T cell therapy is an immunotherapy treatment that uses genetically modified T lymphocytes to effectively target tumor cells. CARs are programmed to target tumor-associated antigens as well as replicate rapidly and homogenously, making them potentially very effective as a cancer-therapy. Since the tumor microenvironment has several barriers that limit the ability of CAR T cells to infiltrate the tumor, several strategies have been developed to address this. Localized delivery of CAR T cells in glioblastoma suggested improved anti-tumor activity and engineering these cells to overexpress chemokine receptors suggested improvement of CAR T cell trafficking. As this therapy expands to other diseases, managing its unique toxicity profile, including cytokine release syndrome (CRS), immune effector cell-associated neurotoxicity syndrome (ICANS), and cytopenias, becomes increasingly more important.

== See also ==
- Tumor-associated endothelial cells
