= Neon (disambiguation) =

Neon is a chemical element with symbol Ne and atomic number 10.

Neon or NEON may also refer to:

== Lighting ==
- Neon lighting, broad discussion of technologies and uses
- Neon sign, luminous-tube signs that contain neon or other inert gases
- Neon lamp, miniature gas discharge lamp

== Classical antiquity ==
- Neon (classical antiquity), the name of a number of figures from Greek and Roman history
- Neon (Phocis), a town of ancient Phocis, Greece

== Biology ==
- Neon tetra, a fish species
- Neon (spider), a genus of jumping spiders
- Neamine transaminase, an enzyme
- Neomycin C transaminase, an enzyme

== Television ==
- Neon, a Finnish television show by FST5
- Neon, a station ident for British television channel BBC Two from the 1991–2001 idents
- Neon (service), a streaming platform owned by New Zealand satellite television company Sky TV
- Neon (TV series), a 2023 American comedy television series on Netflix

== Comics ==
- Neon the Unknown, a comic-book superhero

== Companies and organizations ==
- National Ecological Observatory Network NEON, a project of the U.S. National Science Foundation
- Neon Bus, a low-fare bus line operated by Greyhound Lines serving New York City, Toronto, Syracuse, and Buffalo
- Network of European Observatories in the North (NEON), discoverer of minor planets
- The NEON, a cinema venue in Newport, Wales
- Neon (company), an American film distributor founded in 2017

== Computing ==
- KDE neon a Linux distribution developed by KDE based on Ubuntu
- NEON (instruction set) an extension for the ARM instruction set with SIMD
- An object oriented variant of the Forth programming language
- Neon (game engine), developed by Codemasters
- Neon (music visualization), developed by Jeff Minter
- Gemini 4 Neon, AI language model

== Music ==
- N.E.O.N., acronym for Nevada Encounters of New Music, a symposium and festival of contemporary music

=== Bands ===
- Neon (Australian band), an Australian band
- Neon (British band), a new wave band
- Neon, a Belgian new beat project in the 1980s
- Neon Neon, a musical collaboration between Boom Bip and Gruff Rhys

=== Albums ===
- Neon (Chris Young album)
- Neon (Erra album)
- Neon (Jay Sean album)
- Neon (Richard Fleeshman album)
- Neon (Versa EP)
- Neon (Wednesday Campanella EP)
- Neon, a 1967 album by the Cyrkle
- Neon, a 2018 album by Boris Titulaer
- The Neon (album), a 2020 album by Erasure

=== Songs ===
- “Neon” (A2O Lite song), 2026
- "Neon" (Chris Young song), 2012
- "Neon" (John Mayer song), 2001
- "Neon" (Sfera Ebbasta and Shiva song), 2025
- "Neon (Lonely People)", a 2013 song by Lena Meyer-Landrut
- "Neon", by Ash released in their A–Z Series of singles, 2010
- "Neon", by Clearlake from Amber, 2006
- "Neon", by Kim Jonghyun from the Base EP, 2015
- "Neon", by One Ok Rock from Luxury Disease, 2022
- "Neon", by Prodigal from Electric Eye, 1984
- "Neon", by Yukika Teramoto, 2019

== Other uses ==
- Chrysler Neon, a compact car also sold under the Dodge and Plymouth brands
- Neon Cunha, Brazilian activist
- Neon (dancer), American dancer, dance instructor, and choreographer
- N3on, American streamer and YouTuber
- Neón (wrestler), Mexican professional wrestler
- Neon (magazine), a British film quarterly 1996–1999
- Neon relish, Chicago hot dog accompaniment
- Neon Kurama, a character in Kamen Rider Geats
- Neon pop punk, a subgenre of pop punk music

== See also ==
- Ne (disambiguation)
- Neo (disambiguation)
- NeoN
- Isotopes of neon
