= 5′′-phosphoribostamycin phosphatase =

Class of enzymes

Identifiers
- EC no.: 3.1.3.88

Databases
- BRENDA: enzyme data
- ExPASy: NiceZyme view
- KEGG: enzyme entry
- MetaCyc: metabolic pathway
- Rhea: reactions
- PDB structures: RCSB PDB PDBe PDBsum
Search
- PMC: articles
- PubMed: articles
- NCBI: proteins

5′′-phosphoribostamycin phosphatase (EC 3.1.3.88) is an enzyme with systematic name 5′′-phosphoribostamycin phosphohydrolase. It catalyses the following chemical reaction

5"-phosphoribostamycin
H_{2}O
P_{i}
ribostamycin

The enzyme characterised from Bacillus circulans hydrolyses 5"-phosphoribostamycin to the aminoglycoside antibiotic, ribostamycin, and orthophosphate (P_{i}). The starting material in the biosynthesis is produced from neamine. Ribostamycin is further elaborated to the antibiotics neomycin and butirosin.
