= Kanamycin kinase =

Aminoglycoside-3'-phosphotransferase
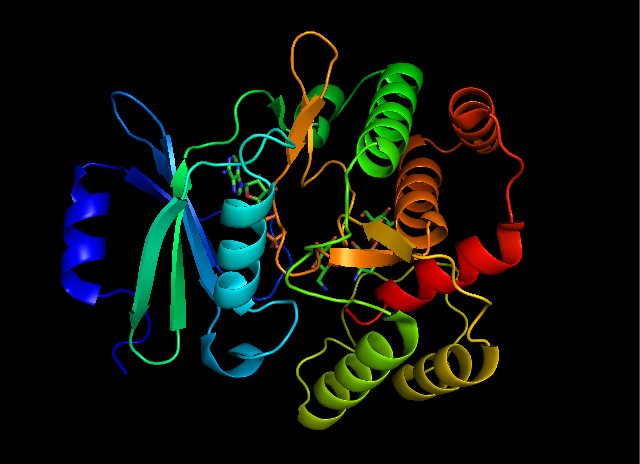
- Structure of APH(3'), taken from 1L8T

Identifiers
- EC no.: 2.7.1.95
- CAS no.: 62213-36-9

Databases
- IntEnz: IntEnz view
- BRENDA: BRENDA entry
- ExPASy: NiceZyme view
- KEGG: KEGG entry
- MetaCyc: metabolic pathway
- PRIAM: profile
- PDB structures: RCSB PDB PDBe PDBsum
- Gene Ontology: AmiGO / QuickGO
Search
- PMC: articles
- PubMed: articles
- NCBI: proteins

Aminoglycoside-3'-phosphotransferase (APH(3'), EC 2.7.1.95) is an enzyme that catalyzes the addition of phosphate from ATP to the 3'-hydroxyl group of a 4,6-disubstituted aminoglycoside such as kanamycin. Primarily positively charged at biological conditions, aminoglycosides bind to the negatively charged backbone of nucleic acids to disrupt protein synthesis, effectively inhibiting bacterial cell growth. APH(3') mediated phosphorylation of aminoglycosides effectively disrupts their mechanism of action, introducing a phosphate group that reduces their binding affinity due to steric hindrances and unfavorable electrostatic interactions. APH(3') is primarily found in certain species of gram-positive bacteria.

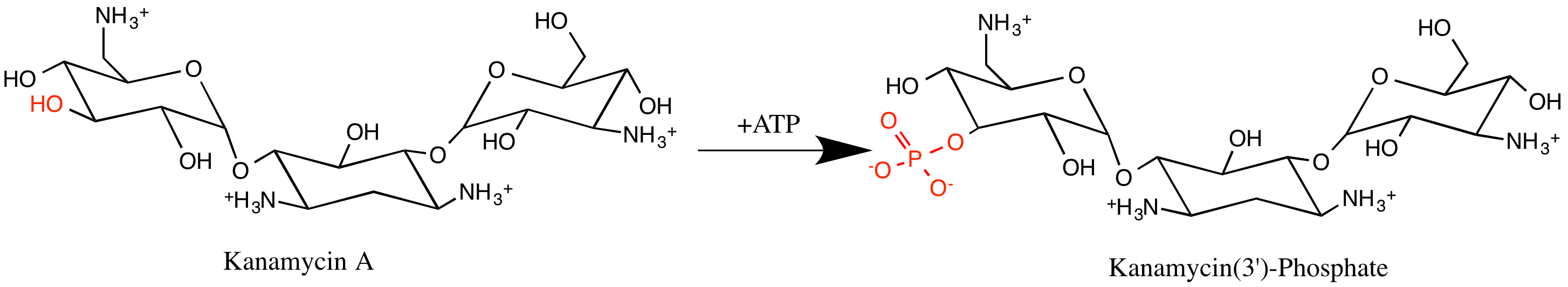
APH(3') catalyzes the phosphorylation of kanamycin A, a 4,6-disubstituted aminoglycoside, at the 3'-hydroxyl group.

This enzyme belongs to the family of transferases, specifically those transferring phosphorus-containing groups (phosphotransferases) with an alcohol group as acceptor. The systematic name of this enzyme class is ATP:kanamycin 3'-O-phosphotransferase.

This enzyme is also known as the (overly broad) names of aminoglycoside phosphotransferase, neomycin-kanamycin phosphotransferase, and kanamycin kinase. These names technically can refer to any enzyme that adds a phosphate group to an aminoglycoside antibiotics, not only at the 3' position. Most of these enzymes belong to the same protein family, with different subfamilies having a different regiospecificity (where to add the phosphate) and substrate specificity (what to add a phos to). Some enzymes can phosphorylate at multiple analogous positions: for example, the APH(3')-IIIa group of APH(3'), found in Enterococci and Staphylococci, are also known to phosphorylate at the 5'-hydroxyl group in 4,5-disubstituted aminoglycosides, which lack a 3'-hydroxyl group, and to diphosphorylate hydroxyl groups in aminoglycosides that have both 3'- and 5'-hydroxyl groups.

== Structure ==
APH(3') thermodynamically favors a dimer form of two identical APH(3') monomers that are connected by two disulfide bonds between Cys19 and Cys156, with the active sites facing each other. However, the large distance between the two monomers' active sites suggests that they are independent of each other, and do not operate in a cooperative fashion. Additionally, dimerization of APH(3') does not affect the activity of the enzyme.

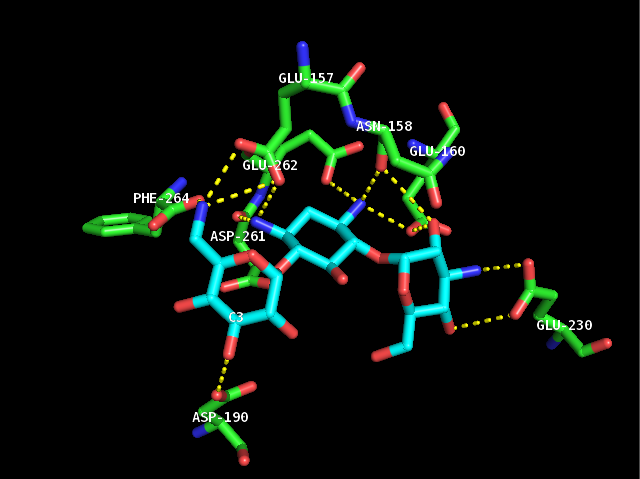
Interactions of negatively charged residues and kanamycin A in APH(3') binding pocket.

Each monomer consists of two lobes, the beta-sheet rich N-terminus and alpha-helix rich C-terminus, with a twelve amino acid region connecting the two. The N-terminal lobe is composed of 5 antiparallel ß-sheets, with an α-helix between sheets 3 and 4. The C-terminal lobe is divided into a central core region (two α-helices and a hairpin-loop followed by four ß-sheets), an insert region (two α-helices connected by a loop structure), and a C-terminal region (two α-helices). The resulting pocket that is encapsulated by the two lobes make up the enzyme active site. This pocket is largely composed of negatively charged amino acid residues, which stabilize the positive charge of and orient the substrate in the active site. Additionally, this pocket is thought to contribute to the promiscuity of the enzyme, allowing it to take in and stabilize several different kinds of aminoglycosides.

== Mechanism ==
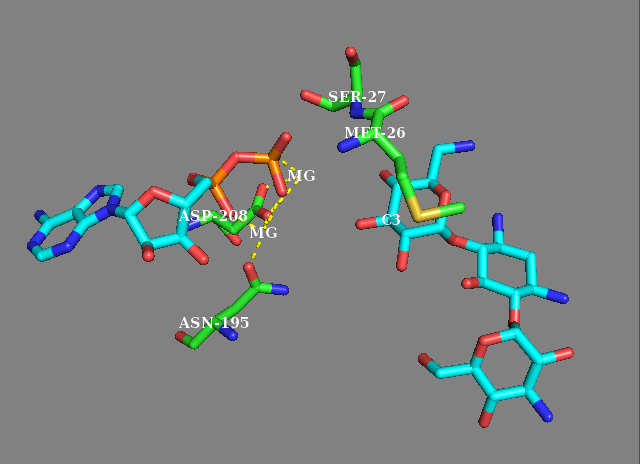
ADP and Kanamycin A in the active site of APH(3'). Two magnesium ions are coordinated by Asn195 and Asp208 residues, which in turn facilitate the binding of ATP in the active site. The NPL, in conjunction with magnesium ions, mediate the phosphorylation of aminoglycosides.

While earlier studies of APH(3') supported a mechanism involving the nucleophilic attack of γ-phosphate by the 3'-hydroxyl, more recent studies suggest that APH(3') catalyzes the transfer of the γ-phosphate from ATP to an aminoglycoside through a dissociative mechanism, where deprotonation of the substrate is not critical to phosphate transfer, but instead the stabilization of a metaphosphate transition state.

Additionally, APH(3') has a nucleotide positioning loop (NPL) that closes down on the enzyme active site after binding ATP, facilitating the phosphorylation of the 3'-hydroxyl group. Key to correctly positioning the phosphate group are Ser27 and Met26 residues. Initially, two magnesium ions stabilized by Asn195 and Asp208 facilitate the binding of ATP in the active site and orient the ß- and γ-phosphate groups. The NPL then undergoes a conformational change to form a hydrogen bond between Ser27 and the ß-phosphate group. Upon binding of substrate, APH(3') undergoes another conformational change to orient Ser27 such that its amide backbone disrupts the alignment of ß-phosphate and γ-phosphate, weakening the γ-phosphate bond. The amide backbone of Met26 forms a hydrogen bond with the metaphosphate to stabilize the transition state, as a magnesium ion (designated Mg1) then lengthens the γ-phosphate bond, breaking it and effectively phosphorylating the hydroxyl group.

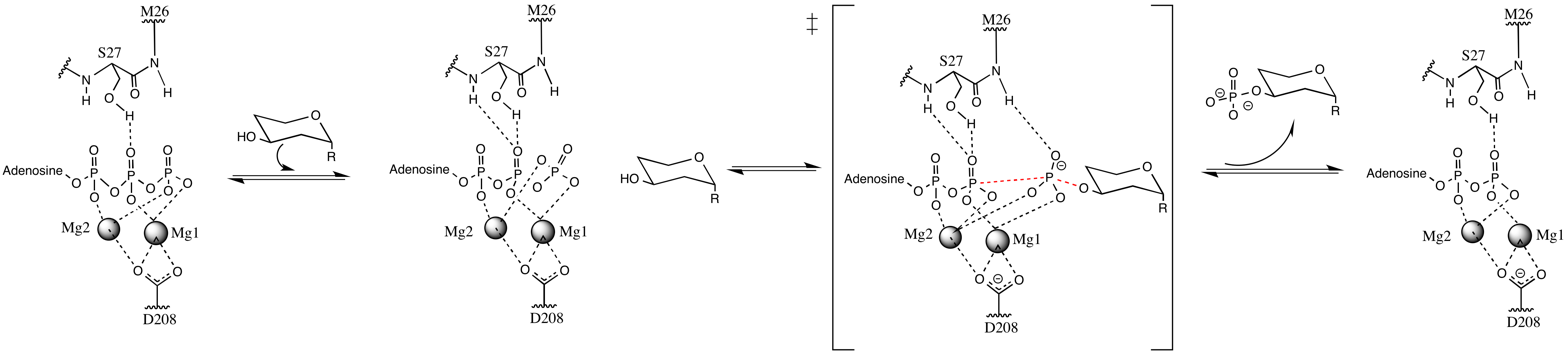
Reaction mechanism of APH(3')-IIIa. Magnesium ions coordinate ATP into place, and the addition of the substrate induces a conformational change that engages the amide backbone of Ser27 in hydrogen bonding with the ß-phosphate, disrupting the γ-PO bond and facilitating the phosphorylation of a 4,6-disubstituted aminoglycoside.

== Evolution ==
=== Subclasses ===
APH(3') is divided into at least seven subclasses, indicated using roman numerials I through VII. Specific characterized groups under each subclass are assigned a lowercase letter; for example, the aph(3′)-Ia gene is found in the Tn903 transposon and commonly incorporated into artificial plasmids as a selectable marker (see below).

=== APHs in general ===
As mentioned before, there are many types of APH when classified according to their catalytic activity. They main classes are named according to where they phosphorylate: known types include APH(4), APH(6), APH(9), APH(3′), APH(2″), APH(3″), and (7″). The numbers refer to the carbon number scheme for aminoglycosides. Examples of APH(3′) and APH(2″) are more numerous than the rest. Most 3′, 2″, and 3″ APHs belong to the same protein family; the rest are more distantly related, but still share the general kinase structure and mechanism.

APHs are used not only by bacteria as a mechanism or resistance to exogenous antibiotics, but also by antibiotic-producing bacteria to protect themselves against the poison being made in their cells. The latter need is more important from an evolutionary standpoint, as the need for resistance to a new antibiotic only arises after the producer species becomes sufficiently successful.

=== Evolutionary context ===
The central core region of APH(3') has a high degree of conformational similarity to the catalytic regions of serine/tyrosine and threonine protein kinases, key parts of cellular regulation in eukaryotes. They also share mechanisms in terms of active site residues. Together the two similarities show that APH(3') and eukaryotic protein kinases are related, despite sharing less than 10% of total residue content. It is known since the late 1990s that serine/tyrosine/threonine protein kinases, once thought to only occur in eukaryotes, are also found in the prokaryotes. By the 2010s, it is generally accepted that the more complex, well-regulated, multidomain eukaryotic protein kinases evolved from a simpler single-domain enzyme similar to APH.

As mentioned above, the initial users of any antibiotic resistance gene should be the bacterium that produces the antibiotic. APH(6) of the "class II" family (distinct from the "class I" of 3') is an enzyme that can play a role in both the production and resistance to streptomycin. As a biosynthetic enzyme, it phosphorylates streptidine; as a resistance enzyme, it phosphorylates the analogous position of streptomycin.

== Use in research ==
Aminoglycoside resistance genes are commonly used in the realm of genetic engineering in order to select for correctly transformed bacterial organisms. When constructing a vector plasmid, including antibiotic resistance in the vector is crucial to effectively expressing the gene of interest. Antibiotics, such as the aminoglycosides kanamycin or neomycin, are added to the cultures during growth phases in order to selectively destroy the cells that did not effectively take up the plasmid. G418 is used for eukaryotic cells as eukaryotic ribosomes are not effectively targeted by kanamycin and neomycin. All three are substrates of APH variants commonly used as markers (usually called neo or neoR on a plasmid).
