= Ribostamycin:4-(gamma-L-glutamylamino)-(S)-2-hydroxybutanoyl-(BtrI acyl-carrier protein) 4-(gamma-L-glutamylamino)-(S)-2-hydroxybutanoate transferase =

Identifiers
- EC no.: 2.3.2.19

Databases
- IntEnz: IntEnz view
- BRENDA: BRENDA entry
- ExPASy: NiceZyme view
- KEGG: KEGG entry
- MetaCyc: metabolic pathway
- PRIAM: profile
- PDB structures: RCSB PDB PDBe PDBsum
Search
- PMC: articles
- PubMed: articles
- NCBI: proteins

Ribostamycin:4-(gamma-L-glutamylamino)-(S)-2-hydroxybutanoyl-(BtrI acyl-carrier protein) 4-(gamma-L-glutamylamino)-(S)-2-hydroxybutanoate transferase (EC 2.3.2.19, btrH (gene)) is an enzyme with systematic name ribostamycin:4-(gamma-L-glutamylamino)-(S)-2-hydroxybutanoyl-(BtrI acyl-carrier protein) 4-(gamma-L-glutamylamino)-(S)-2-hydroxybutanoate transferase. This enzyme catalyses the following chemical reaction

4-(gamma-L-glutamylamino)-(S)-2-hydroxybutanoyl-[BtrI acyl-carrier protein] + ribostamycin $\rightleftharpoons$ gamma-L-glutamyl-butirosin B + BtrI acyl-carrier protein

The enzyme attaches the side chain of the aminoglycoside antibiotics of the butirosin family.
