= Paromamine 6'-oxidase =

Class of enzymes

Identifiers
- EC no.: 1.1.3.43

Databases
- IntEnz: IntEnz view
- BRENDA: BRENDA entry
- ExPASy: NiceZyme view
- KEGG: KEGG entry
- MetaCyc: metabolic pathway
- PRIAM: profile
- PDB structures: RCSB PDB PDBe PDBsum
Search
- PMC: articles
- PubMed: articles
- NCBI: proteins

Paromamine 6'-oxidase (EC 1.1.3.43, btrQ (gene), neoG (gene), kanI (gene), tacB (gene)) is an enzyme with systematic name paromamine:oxygen 6'-oxidoreductase. It catalyses the following chemical reaction

paromamine
O_{2}
H_{2}O_{2}
6'-oxoparomamine

Ribostamycin

The enzyme characterised from Streptomyces fradiae uses molecular oxygen to convert the primary alcohol of the glucosamine sugar unit into its aldehyde, giving hydrogen peroxide as a byproduct. This is a step in the biosynthesis of several aminoglycoside antibiotics, including kanamycin, butirosin, neomycin and ribostamycin.
