= NEOL =

NEOL may refer to:

- 5''-phosphoribostamycin phosphatase, an enzyme
- 2'-N-acetylparomamine deacetylase, an enzyme
- 2'''-acetyl-6'''-hydroxyneomycin C deacetylase, an enzyme
- Nerium oleander, a toxic plant

== See also ==
- Neol Davies, English musician and composer
