= 2-Deoxy-scyllo-inosamine dehydrogenase (SAM-dependent) =

Enzyme

2-deoxy-scyllo-inosamine dehydrogenase (SAM-dependent)

Identifiers
- EC no.: 1.1.99.38

Databases
- IntEnz: IntEnz view
- BRENDA: BRENDA entry
- ExPASy: NiceZyme view
- KEGG: KEGG entry
- MetaCyc: metabolic pathway
- PRIAM: profile
- PDB structures: RCSB PDB PDBe PDBsum
Search
- PMC: articles
- PubMed: articles
- NCBI: proteins

2-deoxy-scyllo-inosamine dehydrogenase (SAM-dependent) (EC 1.1.99.38, btrN (gene)) is an enzyme with systematic name 2-deoxy-scyllo-inosamine:S-adenosyl-L-methionine 1-oxidoreductase. This enzyme catalyses the following chemical reaction

2-deoxy-scyllo-inosamine
+ S-adenosyl methionine
methionine
methionine
3-amino-2,3-dideoxy-scyllo-inosose
+ 5'-deoxyadenosine

This enzyme participates in the biosynthetic pathway of the aminoglycoside antibiotics of the butirosin family.
