= KanF =

kanF may refer to:

- 2-Deoxystreptamine N-acetyl-D-glucosaminyltransferase, an enzyme
- 2-Deoxystreptamine glucosyltransferase, an enzyme
