= 4-(Gamma-L-glutamylamino)butanoyl-(BtrI acyl-carrier protein) monooxygenase =

Class of enzymes

4-(gamma-L-glutamylamino)butanoyl-(BtrI acyl-carrier protein) monooxygenase

Identifiers
- EC no.: 1.14.14.13

Databases
- IntEnz: IntEnz view
- BRENDA: BRENDA entry
- ExPASy: NiceZyme view
- KEGG: KEGG entry
- MetaCyc: metabolic pathway
- PRIAM: profile
- PDB structures: RCSB PDB PDBe PDBsum
Search
- PMC: articles
- PubMed: articles
- NCBI: proteins

4-(gamma-L-glutamylamino)butanoyl-(BtrI acyl-carrier protein) monooxygenase (EC 1.14.14.13, btrO (gene)) is an enzyme with systematic name 4-(gamma-L-glutamylamino)butanoyl-(BtrI acyl-carrier protein),FMN:oxygen oxidoreductase (2-hydroxylating). This enzyme catalyses the following chemical reaction

4-(gamma-L-glutamylamino)butanoyl-[BtrI acyl-carrier protein] + FMNH2 + O_{2} $\rightleftharpoons$ 4-(gamma-L-glutamylamino)-(2S)-2-hydroxybutanoyl-[BtrI acyl-carrier protein] + FMN + H_{2}O

4-(gamma-L-glutamylamino)butanoyl-(BtrI acyl-carrier protein) monooxygenase catalyses a step in the biosynthesis of the side chain of the aminoglycoside antibiotics of the butirosin family.
