= UDP-GlcNAc:ribostamycin N-acetylglucosaminyltransferase =

Class of enzymes

Identifiers
- EC no.: 2.4.1.285

Databases
- IntEnz: IntEnz view
- BRENDA: BRENDA entry
- ExPASy: NiceZyme view
- KEGG: KEGG entry
- MetaCyc: metabolic pathway
- PRIAM: profile
- PDB structures: RCSB PDB PDBe PDBsum
Search
- PMC: articles
- PubMed: articles
- NCBI: proteins

UDP-GlcNAc:ribostamycin N-acetylglucosaminyltransferase (EC 2.4.1.285, neoK (gene)) is an enzyme with systematic name UDP-N-acetyl-alpha-D-glucosamine:ribostamycin N-acetylglucosaminyltransferase. This enzyme catalyses the following chemical reaction

UDP-N-acetyl-alpha-D-glucosamine + ribostamycin $\rightleftharpoons$ UDP + 2'''-acetyl-6'''-hydroxyneomycin C

Involved in biosynthesis of the aminoglycoside antibiotic neomycin.
