= Netilmicin =

Chemical compound

Clinical data
- Trade names: Netromycin
- Other names: 1-N-Ethylsisomicin
- AHFS/Drugs.com: Monograph
- MedlinePlus: a605011
- Routes of administration: Topical
- ATC code: J01GB07 (WHO) S01AA23 (WHO)

Legal status
- Legal status: CA: ℞-only; UK: POM (Prescription only)

Pharmacokinetic data
- Bioavailability: ~0%
- Elimination half-life: 2.5 hours

Identifiers
- IUPAC name: (2R,3R,4R,5R)-2-{[(1S,2S,3R,4S,6R)-4-Amino-3-{[(2S,3R)-3-amino-6-(aminomethyl)-3,4-dihydro-2H-pyran-2-yl]oxy}-6-(ethylamino)-2-hydroxycyclohexyl]oxy}-5-methyl-4-(methylamino)oxane-3,5-diol
- CAS Number: 56391-56-1
- PubChem CID: 41859
- DrugBank: DB00955
- ChemSpider: 38195
- UNII: 4O5J85GJJB
- KEGG: D08268
- ChEMBL: ChEMBL1572
- CompTox Dashboard (EPA): DTXSID1048542
- ECHA InfoCard: 100.054.661

Chemical and physical data
- Formula: C_{21}H_{41}N_{5}O_{7}
- Molar mass: 475.587 g·mol^{−1}
- 3D model (JSmol): Interactive image
- SMILES: O[C@]3(C)[C@H](NC)[C@@H](O)[C@@H](O[C@H]2[C@H](NCC)C[C@H](N)[C@@H](OC1O\C(=C/CC1N)CN)[C@@H]2O)OC3
- InChI: InChI=1S/C21H41N5O7/c1-4-26-13-7-12(24)16(32-19-11(23)6-5-10(8-22)31-19)14(27)17(13)33-20-15(28)18(25-3)21(2,29)9-30-20/h5,11-20,25-29H,4,6-9,22-24H2,1-3H3/t11?,12-,13+,14-,15+,16+,17-,18+,19?,20+,21-/m0/s1; Key:CIDUJQMULVCIBT-KALHTFJLSA-N

Netilmicin (1-N-ethylsisomicin) is a semisynthetic aminoglycoside antibiotic, and a derivative of sisomicin, produced by Micromonospora inyoensis. Aminoglycoside antibiotics have the ability to kill a wide variety of bacteria. Netilmicin is not absorbed from the gut and is therefore only given by injection or infusion. It is only used in the treatment of serious infections particularly those resistant to gentamicin.

It was patented in 1973 and approved for medical use in 1981. It was approved for medical use in the UK in December 2019, for the treatment of external infections of the eye. It is on the World Health Organization's List of Essential Medicines.

== Comparison with drugs ==
According to the British National Formulary (BNF), netilmicin has similar activity to gentamicin, but less ototoxicity in those needing treatment for longer than 10 days. Netilmicin is active against a number of gentamicin-resistant Gram-negative bacteria but is less active against Pseudomonas aeruginosa than gentamicin or tobramycin.
