= Neamine =

Chemical compound

Clinical data
- Other names: Neomycin A

Identifiers
- IUPAC name: (1R,2R,3S,4R,6S)-4,6-Diamino-2,3-dihydroxycyclohexyl 2,6-diamino-2,6-dideoxy-α-D-glucopyranoside
- CAS Number: 3947-65-7
- PubChem CID: 72392
- DrugBank: DB04808
- ChemSpider: 65325
- UNII: 5981U00LY0
- CompTox Dashboard (EPA): DTXSID7023358

Chemical and physical data
- Formula: C_{12}H_{26}N_{4}O_{6}
- Molar mass: 322.362 g·mol^{−1}
- 3D model (JSmol): Interactive image
- SMILES: O([C@H]1[C@H](O)[C@@H](O)[C@H](N)C[C@@H]1N)[C@H]2O[C@@H]([C@@H](O)[C@H](O)[C@H]2N)CN
- InChI: InChI=1S/C12H26N4O6/c13-2-5-8(18)9(19)6(16)12(21-5)22-11-4(15)1-3(14)7(17)10(11)20/h3-12,17-20H,1-2,13-16H2/t3-,4+,5-,6-,7+,8-,9-,10-,11-,12-/m1/s1; Key:SYJXFKPQNSDJLI-HKEUSBCWSA-N

Neamine (neomycin A) is a degradation product of the aminoglycoside antibiotic neomycin. Several derivatives of neamine are active against susceptible and resistant Gram-positive and Gram-negative bacteria.

== Biosynthesis ==
Neamine is a biosynthetic intermediate in the pathway which bacteria such as Streptomyces kanamyceticus use to make aminoglycoside antibiotics including lividomycin, neomycin and kanamycin. The immediate precursor is the aldehyde, 6'-oxoparomamine, which is acted on by the enzyme neamine transaminase:

6'-Oxoparomamine
+
L-Glutamic acid
Neamine
+
α-Ketoglutaric acid

Kanamycin A
