= 2-Deoxystreptamine glucosyltransferase =

Class of enzymes

2-deoxystreptamine glucosyltransferase

Identifiers
- EC no.: 2.4.1.284

Databases
- IntEnz: IntEnz view
- BRENDA: BRENDA entry
- ExPASy: NiceZyme view
- KEGG: KEGG entry
- MetaCyc: metabolic pathway
- PRIAM: profile
- PDB structures: RCSB PDB PDBe PDBsum
Search
- PMC: articles
- PubMed: articles
- NCBI: proteins

2-deoxystreptamine glucosyltransferase (EC 2.4.1.284, kanF (gene)) is an enzyme with systematic name UDP-alpha-D-glucose:2-deoxystreptamine 6-alpha-D-glucosyltransferase. It catalyses the following chemical reaction

2-deoxystreptamine
+ UDP-glucose
UDP
2'-deamino-2'-hydroxyparomamine

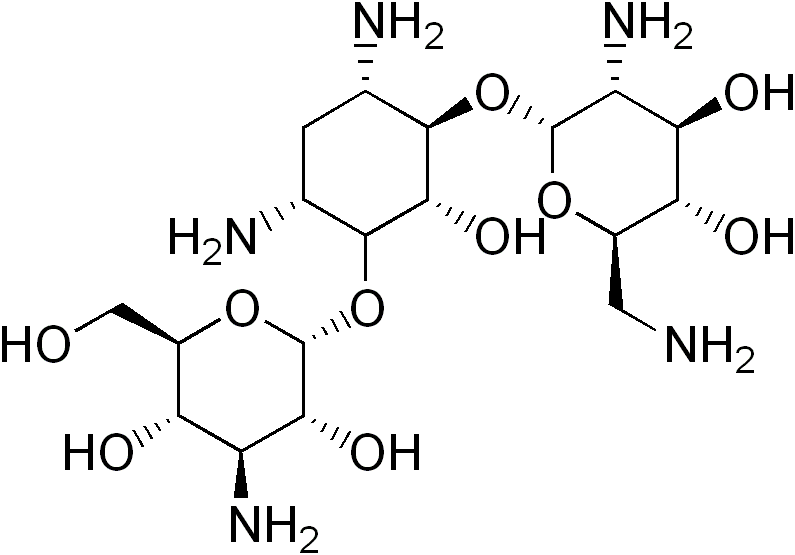
Kanamycin B

This is an early step in the biosynthesis of the aminoglycoside antibiotics, kanamycin B and kanamycin C in Streptomyces kanamyceticus.
