= Neomycin C transaminase =

Identifiers
- EC no.: 2.6.1.95

Databases
- BRENDA: enzyme data
- ExPASy: NiceZyme view
- KEGG: enzyme entry
- MetaCyc: metabolic pathway
- Rhea: reactions
- PDB structures: RCSB PDB PDBe PDBsum
Search
- PMC: articles
- PubMed: articles
- NCBI: proteins

Neomycin C transaminase (EC 2.6.1.95, neoN (gene)) is an enzyme with systematic name 2-oxoglutarate:neomycin C aminotransferase. It catalyses the final step in the biosynthesis of neomycin C, which transfers an amino group from L-glutamic acid to the aldehyde, 6"'-oxoneomycin C, with α-ketoglutaric acid as a byproduct. The preceding two steps in the sequence are catalysed by 2"'-acetyl-6"'-hydroxyneomycin C deacetylase and 6"'-hydroxyneomycin C oxidase.

6"'-oxoneomycin C
+
L-glutamic acid
neomycin C
+
α-ketoglutaric acid
