= Neamine transaminase =

Enzyme

Identifiers
- EC no.: 2.6.1.93

Databases
- IntEnz: IntEnz view
- BRENDA: BRENDA entry
- ExPASy: NiceZyme view
- KEGG: KEGG entry
- MetaCyc: metabolic pathway
- PRIAM: profile
- PDB structures: RCSB PDB PDBe PDBsum
Search
- PMC: articles
- PubMed: articles
- NCBI: proteins

Neamine transaminase (EC 2.6.1.93, glutamate---6'-dehydroparomamine aminotransferase, btrB (gene), neoN (gene), kacL (gene)) is an enzyme with systematic name neamine:2-oxoglutarate aminotransferase. It catalyses a chemical reaction that is part of the biosynthesis of a number of aminoglycoside antibiotics including lividomycin, neomycin and kanamycin. In these pathways in bacteria such as Streptomyces kanamyceticus the reaction converts 6'-oxoparomamine to neamine.

Neamine
+
α-Ketoglutaric acid
6'-Oxoparomamine
+
L-Glutamic acid

Kanamycin A
