= 2'-N-acetylparomamine deacetylase =

Class of enzymes

Identifiers
- EC no.: 3.5.1.112

Databases
- BRENDA: enzyme data
- ExPASy: NiceZyme view
- KEGG: enzyme entry
- MetaCyc: metabolic pathway
- Rhea: reactions
- PDB structures: RCSB PDB PDBe PDBsum
Search
- PMC: articles
- PubMed: articles
- NCBI: proteins

2'-N-acetylparomamine deacetylase (EC 3.5.1.112, btrD (gene), neoL (gene), kanN (gene)) is an enzyme characterisd from Bacillus circulans with systematic name 2'-N-acetylparomamine hydrolase (acetate-forming). It catalyses the hydrolysi of 2'-N-acetylparomamine to paromamine and acetic acid:

2'-N-acetylparomamine
H_{2}O
CH_{3}CO_{2}H
paromamine

This enzyme takes part in the biosynthetic pathways of several clinically important aminocyclitol antibiotics, including kanamycin, butirosin, neomycin and ribostamycin.
