= Streptomyces coeruleoprunus =

Scientific classification
- Domain: Bacteria
- Kingdom: Bacillati
- Phylum: Actinomycetota
- Class: Actinomycetes
- Order: Streptomycetales
- Family: Streptomycetaceae
- Genus: Streptomyces
- Species: S. coeruleoprunus

Binomial name
- Streptomyces coeruleoprunus Preobrazhenskaya 1986

Type strain
- AS 4.1648, ATCC 43681, BCRC 16857, CCRC 16857, CGMCC 4.1648, DSM 41472, IFO 15400, INA 1655, JCM 6919, NBRC 15400, NRRL B-16364, VKM Ac-1208

Species of bacterium

Streptomyces coeruleoprunus is a bacterium species from the genus of Streptomyces. Streptomyces coeruleoprunus produces neomycin B.

== See also ==
- List of Streptomyces species
