= BTRC =

BTRC may refer to:

- Bangladesh Telecommunication Regulatory Commission, an independent commission of Bangladesh Government
- Beta-transducin repeat containing, a human gene
- Blacksburg Tactical Research Center, an American game publishing company
- Belteleradio, the state television and radio broadcasting service in Belarus.
- 2-deoxy-scyllo-inosose synthase, an enzyme
