= NeoN =

NeoN may refer to either of two enzymes, both catalyzing neomycin or its products:

- Neamine transaminase
- Neomycin C transaminase
