= Gentamicin 2'-N-acetyltransferase =

gentamicin 2'-N-acetyltransferase

Identifiers
- EC no.: 2.3.1.59
- CAS no.: 50864-40-9

Databases
- IntEnz: IntEnz view
- BRENDA: BRENDA entry
- ExPASy: NiceZyme view
- KEGG: KEGG entry
- MetaCyc: metabolic pathway
- PRIAM: profile
- PDB structures: RCSB PDB PDBe PDBsum
- Gene Ontology: AmiGO / QuickGO
Search
- PMC: articles
- PubMed: articles
- NCBI: proteins

In enzymology, a gentamicin 2'-N-acetyltransferase (EC 2.3.1.59) is an enzyme that catalyzes the chemical reaction

acetyl-CoA + gentamicin C_{1}a $\rightleftharpoons$ CoA + N_{2}'-acetylgentamicin C_{1}a

Thus, the two substrates of this enzyme are acetyl-CoA and gentamicin C1a, whereas its two products are CoA and N2'-acetyl gentamicin C1a.

This enzyme belongs to the family of transferases, specifically those acyltransferases transferring groups other than aminoacyl groups. The systematic name of this enzyme class is acetyl-CoA:gentamicin-C1a N2'-acetyltransferase. Other names in common use include gentamicin acetyltransferase II, gentamicin 2'-N-acetyltransferase, and acetyl-CoA:gentamicin-C1a N2'-acetyltransferase.
