= Streptomyces brasiliensis =

Scientific classification
- Domain: Bacteria
- Kingdom: Bacillati
- Phylum: Actinomycetota
- Class: Actinomycetes
- Order: Streptomycetales
- Family: Streptomycetaceae
- Genus: Streptomyces
- Species: S. brasiliensis

Binomial name
- Streptomyces brasiliensis Goodfellow et al. 1986

Type strain
- ATCC 23727, BCRC 16849, CBS 520.68, CCIB, CCIB 71, CCRC 16849, CGMCC 4.1486, CUB 126, DSM 43159, IFM 1210, IFO 12596, IMET 43493, IMRU 2572, IMUR 2572, JCM 3086, KCC 3086, KCC A-0086, KCTC 9071, KCTC 9195, NBRC 101283, NBRC 12596, NRRL B-3327, RIA 911, VKM Ac-1310, VKM Ac-656

Synonyms
- Elytrosporangium brasiliensis Falcão de Morais et al. 1966 (Approved Lists 1980); Elytrosporangium brasiliense corrig. Falcão de Morais et al. 1966 (Approved Lists 1980)

Species of bacterium

Streptomyces brasiliensis is a bacterial species of the genus Streptomyces that has been isolated from soil. S. brasiliensis produces neomycin. S. brasiliensis sporulates when it is cultured with galactose and glutamic acid as carbon and nitrogen sources. The colonies are red/pink or red/orange, and the pigment is not permeable. Sucrose nitrate synthesize AGAR: gas filaments slightly pink, white. Spore filaments are non-helical. They are ovoid, spherical.

== See also ==
- List of Streptomyces species
