= C23H46N6O13 =

The molecular formula C_{23}H_{46}N_{6}O_{13} (molar mass: 614.64 g/mol, exact mass: 614.3123 u) may refer to:

- Neomycin
