= 2'''-acetyl-6'''-hydroxyneomycin C deacetylase =

Class of enzymes

Identifiers
- EC no.: 3.5.1.113

Databases
- BRENDA: enzyme data
- ExPASy: NiceZyme view
- KEGG: enzyme entry
- MetaCyc: metabolic pathway
- Rhea: reactions
- PDB structures: RCSB PDB PDBe PDBsum
Search
- PMC: articles
- PubMed: articles
- NCBI: proteins

2'''-acetyl-6'''-hydroxyneomycin C deacetylase (EC 3.5.1.113, neoL (gene)) is an enzyme with systematic name 2'''-acetyl-6'''-hydroxyneomycin C hydrolase (acetate-forming). It catalyses the hydrolysis of 2"'-acetyl-6"'-hydroxyneomycin C to 6"'-hydroxyneomycin C and acetic acid:

2"'-acetyl-6"'-hydroxyneomycin C
H_{2}O
CH_{3}CO_{2}H
6"'-hydroxyneomycin C

This enzyme is involved in biosynthesis of aminoglycoside antibiotics of the neomycin family.
