= G418 =

Names
- IUPAC name (1S,2S,3R,4S,6R)-4,6-Diamino-2-hydroxycyclohexane-1,3-diyl 1-(3-amino-3-deoxy-4-C-methyl-β-L-arabinopyranoside) 3-(2-amino-2,7-dideoxy-D-glycero-α-D-gluco-heptopyranoside)
- Systematic IUPAC name (2R,3S,4R,5R,6S)-5-Amino-6-{[(1R,2S,3S,4R,6S)-4,6-diamino-3-{[(2R,3R,4R,5R)-3,5-dihydroxy-5-methyl-4-(methylamino)oxan-2-yl]oxy}-2-hydroxycyclohexyl]oxy}-2-[(1R)-1-hydroxyethyl]oxane-3,4-diol
- Other names Geneticin, 6'-deamino-6'-hydroxy-gentamicin B_{1} O-2-Amino-2,7-didesoxy-D-glycero-α-D-gluco-heptopyranosyl-(1→4)-O-(3-desoxy-4-C-methyl-3-(methylamino)-β-L-arabinopyranosyl- (1→6))-D-streptamin

Identifiers
CAS Number	49863-47-0; 108321-42-2 (disulfate salt)
3D model (JSmol)	Interactive image
ChEMBL	ChEMBL215226
ChemSpider	21106441
DrugBank	DB04263
PubChem CID	123865
UNII	A08F5XTI6G
CompTox Dashboard (EPA)	DTXSID10198129
- InChI: InChI=1S/C20H40N4O10/c1-6(25)14-11(27)10(26)9(23)18(32-14)33-15-7(21)4-8(22)16(12(15)28)34-19-13(29)17(24-3)20(2,30)5-31-19/h6-19,24-30H,4-5,21-23H2,1-3H3/t6-,7-,8+,9+,10+,11-,12-,13+,14?,15+,16-,17+,18+,19+,20-/m0/s1 Key: BRZYSWJRSDMWLG-NQRKCNNJSA-N; InChI=1/C20H40N4O10/c1-6(25)14-11(27)10(26)9(23)18(32-14)33-15-7(21)4-8(22)16(12(15)28)34-19-13(29)17(24-3)20(2,30)5-31-19/h6-19,24-30H,4-5,21-23H2,1-3H3/t6-,7-,8+,9+,10+,11-,12-,13+,14?,15+,16-,17+,18+,19+,20-/m0/s1 Key: BRZYSWJRSDMWLG-NQRKCNNJBI
- SMILES: O[C@H]3[C@H](O)[C@@H](N)[C@@H](O[C@@H]2[C@@H](N)C[C@@H](N)[C@H](O[C@H]1OC[C@](C)(O)[C@H](NC)[C@H]1O)[C@H]2O)OC3[C@@H](O)C

Properties
Chemical formula	C_{20}H_{40}N_{4}O_{10}
Molar mass	496.558 g·mol^{−1}
Solubility in water	50 mg/mL
- Except where otherwise noted, data are given for materials in their standard state (at 25 °C [77 °F], 100 kPa). verify (what is ?) Infobox references

G418 (genericized trade name geneticin) is an aminoglycoside antibiotic similar in structure to gentamicin B1. It is produced by Micromonospora rhodorangea. G418 blocks polypeptide synthesis by inhibiting the elongation step in both prokaryotic and eukaryotic cells. It is most commonly supplied as a sulfate or disulfate salt.

G418 is commonly used in laboratory research to select genetically engineered cells. Resistance to G418 is conferred by an aminoglycoside-3'-phosphotransferase (APH(3')).In general, for bacteria and algae, concentrations of 5 μg/mL or less are used; for mammalian cells, concentrations of approximately 400 μg/mL are used for selection and 200 μg/mL for maintenance. However, optimal concentration for resistant clones selection in mammalian cells depends on the cell line used as well as on the plasmid carrying the resistance gene. Therefore, antibiotic titration should be done to find the best condition for every experimental system. Titration should be done using antibiotic concentrations ranging from 100 μg/mL up to 1400 μg/mL. Resistant clones selection could require from 1 to up to 3 weeks.

== Use in cell biology ==
G418 is routinely used as a selective agent in cell culture set-ups. Researchers can link the neoR selective resistance gene with their vector. Then if the vector is successfully introduced into cells, the cells can become G418-resistant cells. After treating with G418, these vector(-) cells will die, while vector(+) cells will survive. This method can help researchers select vector(+) cells.

== Mechanism of action ==
Aminoglycosides prevent protein synthesis at the early stages of elongation, post-initiation, initiation of translation. Unlike other aminoglycosides, G418 is quite active against the eukaryotic ribosome.

Resistance to G418 is conferred by an aminoglycoside 3'-phosphotransferase (APH(3')), which adds a phosphate group at the 3' position to produce G418 3-phosphate, a substance with much lower ribosome-binding ability. This gene is generally labeled neo or neoR in the context of genetic engineering. Two versions are commonly used in this context, APH(3')-II (specifically IIa) from transposon Tn5 and APH(3')-I (Ia) from Tn903. The former is preferred due to being robust, but the bacteria-derived DNA contains cryptic splice sites. A re-coded version of APH(3')-II called sneo removes these sites and performs codon optimization for mammalian cells.

== Impurity profile ==
G418 is produced by fermentation of Micromonospora rhodorangea followed by isolation. This bacterium produces many other related compounds (gentamicins) while producing G418. Common impurities of G418 include gentamicins A, C1, C1a, C2, C2a and X2.

The quality of G418 as a lab selective agent is not based on just the potency, but more on the selectivity defined by the killing curve of the (naive) sensitive cells vs the (transfected) resistant cells. A good G418 product should have a large difference between the LD/ED_{90} of sensitive and transfected cells. The impurities are generally more toxic to transfected cells than G418 itself; as a result they reduce selectivity.
