= Streptomyces albogriseolus =

Scientific classification
- Domain: Bacteria
- Kingdom: Bacillati
- Phylum: Actinomycetota
- Class: Actinomycetia
- Order: Streptomycetales
- Family: Streptomycetaceae
- Genus: Streptomyces
- Species: S. albogriseolus

Binomial name
- Streptomyces albogriseolus Benedict et al. 1954 (Approved Lists 1980)

Type strain
- ATCC 23875, BCRC 12230, CBS 103.60, CBS 614.68, CCM 3227, CCRC 12230, CGMCC 4.0565, CIP 104424, CIP 104428, DSM 40003, ETH 16834, HUT-6045, ICMP 485, IFO 12834, IFO 3413, IFO 3709, IMRU 3698, ISP 5003, JCM 4004, JCM 4616, KCC S-0004, KCC S-0616, KCCM 40180, KCCS-0004, KCCS-0616, KCTC 9675, KCTC 9773, MTCC 2524, NBRC 12834, NBRC 3413, NBRC 3709, NCIB 9604, NCIM 2438, NCIMB 9604, NCIMB 9812, NRRL B-1305, NRRL-ISP 5003, NZRCC 10320, Pridham7-A, PSA 139, RGB 7A, RIA 1101, Shirling ISP 5003,, VKM Ac-1200, VTT E-01260, VTT E-86260

Species of bacterium

Streptomyces albogriseolus is a bacterium species from the genus of Streptomyces which has been isolated from soil. Streptomyces albogriseolus produces neomycin B and neomycin C.

== See also ==
- List of Streptomyces species
