= 6'''-Hydroxyneomycin C oxidase =

Class of enzymes

6'''-hydroxyneomycin C oxidase

Identifiers
- EC no.: 1.1.3.44

Databases
- BRENDA: enzyme data
- ExPASy: NiceZyme view
- KEGG: enzyme entry
- MetaCyc: metabolic pathway
- Rhea: reactions
- PDB structures: RCSB PDB PDBe PDBsum
Search
- PMC: articles
- PubMed: articles
- NCBI: proteins

6'''-hydroxyneomycin C oxidase (EC 1.1.3.44, neoG (gene)) is an enzyme with systematic name 6'''-deamino-6'''-hydroxyneomycin C:oxygen 6'''-oxidoreductase. It catalyses the oxidation of 6"'-hydroxyneomycin C to 6"'-oxoneomycin C using molecular oxygen as oxidant and giving hydrogen peroxide as byproduct:

6"'-hydroxyneomycin C
O_{2}
H_{2}O_{2}
6"'-oxoneomycin C

This enzyme participates in biosynthesis of aminoglycoside antibiotics of the neomycin family.
