= Verdamicin =

Chemical compound

Clinical data
- Other names: (2R,3R,4R,5R)-2-[(1S,2S,3R,4S,6R)-4,6-diamino-3-[[(2S,3R)-3-amino-6-[(1S)-1-aminoethyl]-3,4-dihydro-2H-pyran-2-yl]oxy]-2-hydroxycyclohexyl]oxy-5-methyl-4-methylaminooxane-3,5-diol
- ATC code: none

Identifiers
- IUPAC name: (1S,2S,3R,4S,6R)-4,6-diamino-3-({(2S,3R)-3-amino-6-[(1S)-1-aminoethyl]-3,4-dihydro-2H-pyran-2-yl}oxy)-2-hydroxycyclohexyl 3-deoxy-4-C-methyl-3-(methylamino)-β-L-arabinopyranoside
- CAS Number: 49863-48-1
- PubChem CID: 512877
- ChemSpider: 447461
- ChEMBL: ChEMBL1276546
- CompTox Dashboard (EPA): DTXSID20964453

Chemical and physical data
- Formula: C_{20}H_{39}N_{5}O_{7}
- Molar mass: 461.560 g·mol^{−1}
- 3D model (JSmol): Interactive image
- SMILES: C[C@@H](C1=CC[C@H]([C@H](O1)O[C@@H]2[C@H](C[C@H]([C@@H]([C@H]2O)O[C@@H]3[C@@H]([C@H]([C@@](CO3)(C)O)NC)O)N)N)N)N
- InChI: InChI=1S/C20H39N5O7/c1-8(21)12-5-4-9(22)18(30-12)31-15-10(23)6-11(24)16(13(15)26)32-19-14(27)17(25-3)20(2,28)7-29-19/h5,8-11,13-19,25-28H,4,6-7,21-24H2,1-3H3/t8-,9+,10-,11+,13-,14+,15+,16-,17+,18+,19+,20-/m0/s1; Key:XUSXOPRDIDWMFO-CTMSJIKGSA-N

Verdamicin is an aminoglycoside antibiotic produced by Micromonospora grisea.
