= Neomycin/polymyxin B/hydrocortisone =

Combination drug

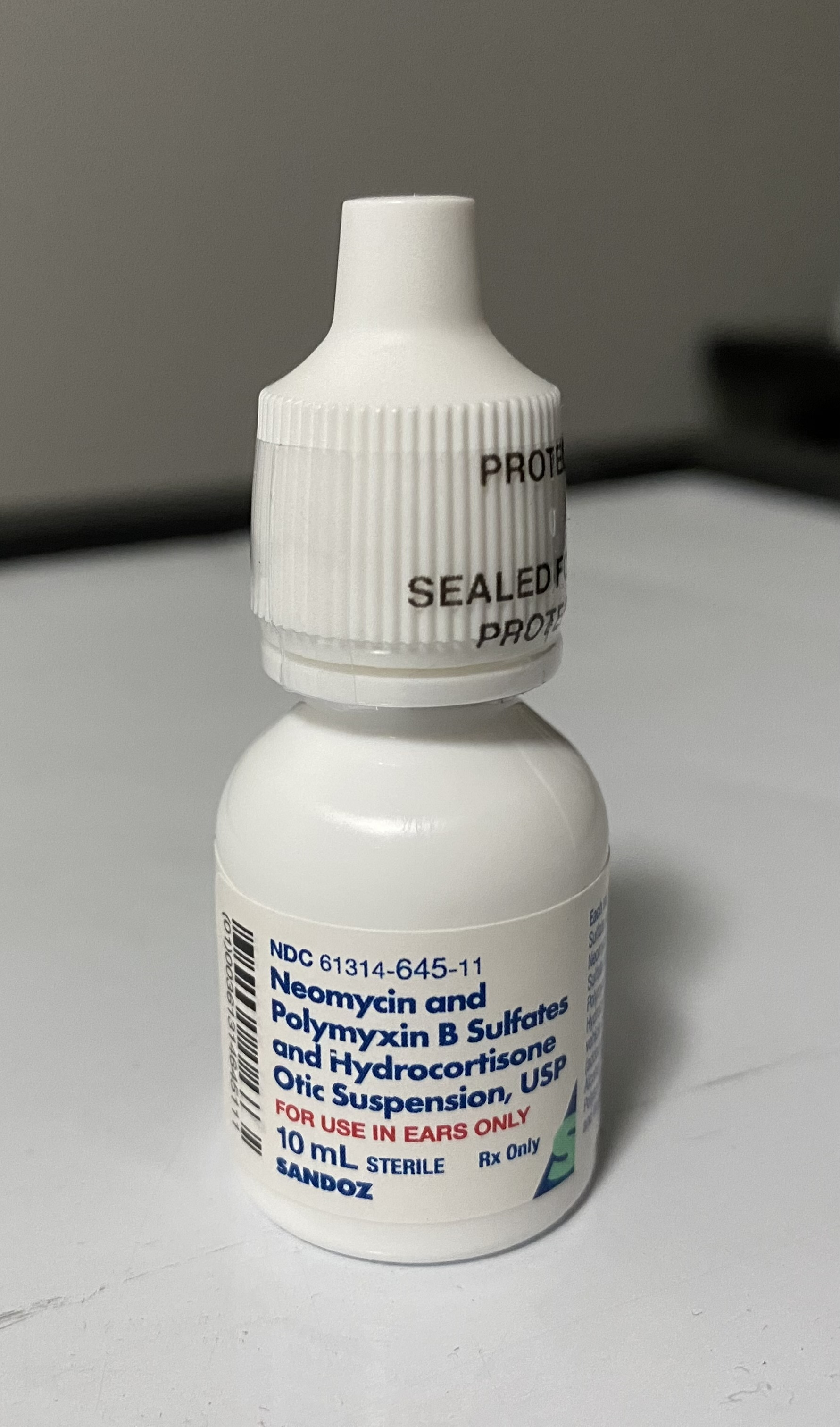

Combination of
- Neomycin: Antibiotic
- Polymyxin B: Antibiotic
- Hydrocortisone: Glucocorticoid

Clinical data
- Trade names: Otosporin, Cortisporin, others
- AHFS/Drugs.com: FDA Professional Drug Information
- Routes of administration: Ear drop
- ATC code: None

Legal status
- Legal status: US: ℞-only

Identifiers
- CAS Number: 8024-64-4
- KEGG: D11855

Neomycin/polymyxin B/hydrocortisone, sold under the brand Otosporin among others, is a medication used to treat otitis externa (swimmer's ear) and certain eye disorders. It consists of the antibiotics neomycin and polymyxin B, and the steroid hydrocortisone. It is used as an ear drop or eye drop.

The most common side effects include itchiness and a skin rash. Other side effects may include dizziness, hives, anaphylaxis, hearing loss, and headache. Safety in pregnancy and breastfeeding is unclear. The antibiotics work by killing specific types of bacteria while the steroids work by decreasing inflammation.

The combination was approved for medical use in the United States in 1964. In 2022, it was the 296th most commonly prescribed medication in the United States, with more than 400,000 prescriptions.

== History ==
Cortisporin was developed by Glaxo Wellcome and was approved by the US Food and Drug Administration in 1975. In 1997, the rights were sold to Monarch Pharmaceuticals, a division of King Pharmaceuticals. In 2007, King sold it to JHP Pharmaceuticals. Par Pharmaceutical acquired JHP in 2014. In 2015, Endo International purchased Par.

== Society and culture ==
=== Economics ===
In 2015, the price was $100, and in 2016, it reportedly was selling for $195. A generic version is priced at $144. The drug is owned by Dublin, Ireland-based Endo International.
