= 2-Deoxystreptamine N-acetyl-D-glucosaminyltransferase =

Class of enzymes

2-deoxystreptamine N-acetyl-D-glucosaminyltransferase

Identifiers
- EC no.: 2.4.1.283

Databases
- IntEnz: IntEnz view
- BRENDA: BRENDA entry
- ExPASy: NiceZyme view
- KEGG: KEGG entry
- MetaCyc: metabolic pathway
- PRIAM: profile
- PDB structures: RCSB PDB PDBe PDBsum
Search
- PMC: articles
- PubMed: articles
- NCBI: proteins

2-deoxystreptamine N-acetyl-D-glucosaminyltransferase (EC 2.4.1.283, btrM (gene), neoD (gene), kanF (gene)) is an enzyme with systematic name UDP-N-acetyl-alpha-D-glucosamine:2-deoxystreptamine N-acetyl-D-glucosaminyltransferase. It catalyses the following chemical reaction

UDP-N-acetyl-D-glucosamine +
2-deoxystreptamine
UDP
2'-N-acetylparomamine

Kanamycin A

The enzyme transfers an N-acetylglucosamine sugar unit to one of the hydroxy groups of the aminoglycoside, 2-deoxystreptamine, giving 2'-N-acetylparomamine and uridine diphosphate (UDP). This is an early step in the biosynthesis of clinically important aminoglycoside antibiotics including neomycin and kanamycin.
