= Streptomycin 3"-kinase =

Class of enzymes

streptomycin 3"-kinase

Identifiers
- EC no.: 2.7.1.87
- CAS no.: 39391-15-6

Databases
- IntEnz: IntEnz view
- BRENDA: BRENDA entry
- ExPASy: NiceZyme view
- KEGG: KEGG entry
- MetaCyc: metabolic pathway
- PRIAM: profile
- PDB structures: RCSB PDB PDBe PDBsum
- Gene Ontology: AmiGO / QuickGO
Search
- PMC: articles
- PubMed: articles
- NCBI: proteins

In enzymology, a streptomycin 3"-kinase (EC 2.7.1.87) is an enzyme that catalyzes the chemical reaction

ATP + streptomycin $\rightleftharpoons$ ADP + streptomycin 3"-phosphate

The enzyme characterised from Streptomyces bacteria converts the antibiotic, streptomycin, to a monophosphate, streptomycin 3''-phosphate, by transferring a phosphate group from the cofactor, adenosine triphosphate (ATP), which is converted to adenosine diphosphate (ADP).

This enzyme is a transferases, specifically one transferring phosphorus-containing groups (phosphotransferases) with an alcohol group as acceptor. The systematic name of this enzyme class is ATP:streptomycin 3"-phosphotransferase. Other names in common use include streptomycin 3"-kinase (phosphorylating), and streptomycin 3"-phosphotransferase.
