= Lividomycin =

Chemical compound

Identifiers
- IUPAC name: (1R,2R,3S,4R,6S)-4,6-Diamino-3-hydroxy-2-{[α-D-mannopyranosyl-(1->4)-2,6-diamino-2,6-dideoxy-β-L-idopyranosyl-(1->3)-β-D-ribofuranosyl]oxy}cyclohexyl 2-amino-2,3-dideoxy-α-D-ribo-hexopyranoside
- CAS Number: 36441-41-5
- PubChem CID: 72394
- DrugBank: DB04728
- ChemSpider: 65327
- UNII: A606AJ494W
- ChEBI: CHEBI:71961
- ChEMBL: ChEMBL389029
- CompTox Dashboard (EPA): DTXSID8023218

Chemical and physical data
- Formula: C_{29}H_{55}N_{5}O_{19}
- Molar mass: 777.775 g·mol^{−1}
- 3D model (JSmol): Interactive image
- SMILES: O([C@H]4[C@H](O[C@@H]3O[C@H](CO)[C@@H](O[C@H]2O[C@@H](CN)[C@@H](O[C@H]1O[C@H](CO)[C@@H](O)[C@H](O)[C@@H]1O)[C@H](O)[C@H]2N)[C@H]3O)[C@@H](O)[C@H](N)C[C@@H]4N)[C@H]5O[C@@H]([C@@H](O)C[C@H]5N)CO
- InChI: InChI=1S/C29H55N5O18/c30-3-11-23(51-28-20(43)19(42)17(40)13(5-36)47-28)18(41)15(34)27(45-11)50-24-14(6-37)48-29(21(24)44)52-25-16(39)7(31)1-8(32)22(25)49-26-9(33)2-10(38)12(4-35)46-26/h7-29,35-44H,1-6,30-34H2/t7-,8+,9-,10+,11+,12-,13-,14-,15-,16+,17-,18-,19+,20+,21-,22-,23-,24-,25-,26-,27-,28-,29+/m1/s1; Key:DBLVDAUGBTYDFR-SWMBIRFSSA-N

Lividomycin is a broad-spectrum aminoglycoside antibiotic. It is effective against most Gram-positive and Gram-negative bacteria including Mycobacterium tuberculosis (the causative agent of tuberculosis) and Pseudomonas aeruginosa.
