= Neon (Wednesday Campanella EP) =

EP by Wednesday Campanella
- Released: May 25, 2022
- Genres: J-pop, dance-pop, pop rap
- Length: 25:42
- Language: Japanese
- Label: Warner Music Japan
- Producer: Kenmochi Hidefumi

Wednesday Campanella chronology
Galapagos (2018)	Neon (2022)	RABBIT STAR★ (2023)

Singles from Neon
- 1. "Alice / Buckingham" Released: October 27, 2021; 2. "Maneki Neko / Edison" Released: February 25, 2022

Neon is the twelfth EP by the Japanese group, Wednesday Campanella. It was released on May 25, 2022 under Warner Music Japan. With Utaha's debut in 2021 at Shibuya PARCO, two singles were released. "Alice / Buckingham" and "Maneki Neko / Edison". The music videos were released on the same day.

== Track listing ==
All tracks written and produced by Kenmochi Hidefumi.

No.	Title	Length
1.	"Orihime (織姫)"	2:44
2.	"Himiko (卑弥呼)"	3:07
3.	"Edison (エジソン)"	3:13
4.	"Issunboushi (一寸法師)"	2:25
5.	"Buckingham (バッキンガム)"	3:41
6.	"Alice (アリス)"	3:34
7.	"Moyai (モヤイ)"	3:46
8.	"Maneki Neko (招き猫)"	3:09

== Charts ==
=== Weekly charts ===
Chart (2022)	Peak position
Japanese Albums (Oricon)	12
Japanese Hot Albums (Billboard Japan)	47

=== Year-end charts ===
Chart (2022)	Position
Japanese Albums (Oricon)	12
Japanese Hot Albums (Billboard Japan)	12

== Release history ==
Date	Edition(s)	Format(s)	Label	Ref.
May 25, 2022	Standard	Digital download; streaming	Warner Music Japan	
July 7, 2022	Limited	CD	Warner Music Japan	
May 3, 2023	Standard	CD	Warner Music Japan	
March 13, 2024	Standard	LP	Warner Music Japan	
