= Hygromycin B 4-O-kinase =

Identifiers
- EC no.: 2.7.1.163

Databases
- IntEnz: IntEnz view
- BRENDA: BRENDA entry
- ExPASy: NiceZyme view
- KEGG: KEGG entry
- MetaCyc: metabolic pathway
- PRIAM: profile
- PDB structures: RCSB PDB PDBe PDBsum
Search
- PMC: articles
- PubMed: articles
- NCBI: proteins

Hygromycin B 4-O-kinase (EC 2.7.1.163, hygromycin-B kinase) is an enzyme with systematic name ATP:hygromycin-B 4-O-phosphotransferase. This enzyme catalyses the following chemical reaction

ATP + hygromycin B $\rightleftharpoons$ ADP + 4-O-phosphohygromycin B

Phosphorylates the antibiotic hygromycin B.
