= Streptomycin 6-kinase =

streptomycin 6-kinase

Identifiers
- EC no.: 2.7.1.72
- CAS no.: 37278-11-8

Databases
- IntEnz: IntEnz view
- BRENDA: BRENDA entry
- ExPASy: NiceZyme view
- KEGG: KEGG entry
- MetaCyc: metabolic pathway
- PRIAM: profile
- PDB structures: RCSB PDB PDBe PDBsum
- Gene Ontology: AmiGO / QuickGO
Search
- PMC: articles
- PubMed: articles
- NCBI: proteins

In enzymology, a streptomycin 6-kinase (EC 2.7.1.72) is an enzyme that catalyzes the chemical reaction

ATP + streptomycin $\rightleftharpoons$ ADP + streptomycin 6-phosphate

Thus, the two substrates of this enzyme are ATP and streptomycin, whereas its two products are ADP and streptomycin 6-phosphate.

This enzyme belongs to the family of transferases, specifically those transferring phosphorus-containing groups (phosphotransferases) with an alcohol group as acceptor. The systematic name of this enzyme class is ATP:streptomycin 6-phosphotransferase. Other names in common use include streptidine kinase, SM 6-kinase, streptomycin 6-kinase (phosphorylating), streptidine kinase (phosphorylating), streptomycin 6-O-phosphotransferase, and streptomycin 6-phosphotransferase.

This enzyme participates in streptomycin biosynthesis when it acts on streptidine. It participates in streptomycin resistance when it acts on the analogous position of streptomycin.
