= Sisomicin =

Chemical compound

Clinical data
- Trade names: Baymicin, bactoCeaze
- AHFS/Drugs.com: International Drug Names
- Routes of administration: topical
- ATC code: J01GB08 (WHO)

Legal status
- Legal status: In general: ℞ (Prescription only)

Identifiers
- IUPAC name: (2R,3R,4R,5R)-2-{[(1S,2S,3R,4S,6R)-4,6-diamino-3-{[(2S,3R)-3-amino-6-(aminomethyl)-3,4-dihydro-2H-pyran-2-yl]oxy}-2-hydroxycyclohexyl]oxy}-5-methyl-4-(methylamino)oxane-3,5-diol
- CAS Number: 32385-11-8
- PubChem CID: 36119
- ChemSpider: 33222
- UNII: X55XSL74YQ
- KEGG: D02544
- ChEBI: CHEBI:9169
- ChEMBL: ChEMBL221886
- CompTox Dashboard (EPA): DTXSID0023583
- ECHA InfoCard: 100.046.365

Chemical and physical data
- Formula: C_{19}H_{37}N_{5}O_{7}
- Molar mass: 447.533 g·mol^{−1}
- 3D model (JSmol): Interactive image
- SMILES: C[C@@]1(CO[C@@H]([C@@H]([C@H]1NC)O)O[C@H]2[C@@H](C[C@@H]([C@H]([C@@H]2O)O[C@@H]3[C@@H](CC=C(O3)CN)N)N)N)O
- InChI: InChI=1S/C19H37N5O7/c1-19(27)7-28-18(13(26)16(19)24-2)31-15-11(23)5-10(22)14(12(15)25)30-17-9(21)4-3-8(6-20)29-17/h3,9-18,24-27H,4-7,20-23H2,1-2H3/t9-,10+,11-,12+,13-,14-,15+,16-,17-,18-,19+/m1/s1; Key:URWAJWIAIPFPJE-YFMIWBNJSA-N

Sisomicin (bactoCeaze, ensamycin, and initially antibiotic 6640 and rickamicin), is an aminoglycoside antibiotic, isolated from the fermentation broth of Micromonospora inositola. It is a newer broad-spectrum aminoglycoside most structurally related to gentamicin.

Sisomicin is the most predictably active aminoglycoside against Gram-positive bacteria. Like most other aminoglycosides, sisomicin is bactericidal for sensitive clinical isolates. The minimum bactericidal concentrations (MBC) have been found to be equivalent or very close to the minimum inhibitory concentrations (MIC). Like other aminoglycosides, most clinical isolates of Pseudomonas aeruginosa remain susceptible to sisomicin. Resistance to sisomicin may be enzymatically or non-enzymatically mediated. Sisomicin is inactivated by the same enzymes as gentamicin, but it is active against many organisms that resist gentamicin by non-enzymatic mechanisms.

Some studies show that sisomicin has been effective in the treatment of infections that either had failed to respond to other drugs or were due to microorganisms resistant in vitro to other aminoglycosides.
