= 2-deoxy-scyllo-inosose synthase =

Enzyme

Identifiers
- EC no.: 4.2.3.124

Databases
- IntEnz: IntEnz view
- BRENDA: BRENDA entry
- ExPASy: NiceZyme view
- KEGG: KEGG entry
- MetaCyc: metabolic pathway
- PRIAM: profile
- PDB structures: RCSB PDB PDBe PDBsum
Search
- PMC: articles
- PubMed: articles
- NCBI: proteins

2-deoxy-scyllo-Inosose synthase (EC 4.2.3.124, btrC (gene), neoC (gene), kanC (gene)) is an enzyme with systematic name D-glucose-6-phosphate phosphate-lyase (2-deoxy-scyllo-inosose-forming). This enzyme catalyses the following chemical reaction

D-glucose 6-phosphate $\rightleftharpoons$ 2-deoxy-L-scyllo-inosose + phosphate

This enzyme requires Co^{2+}.
