= Neomycin =

Type of antibiotic

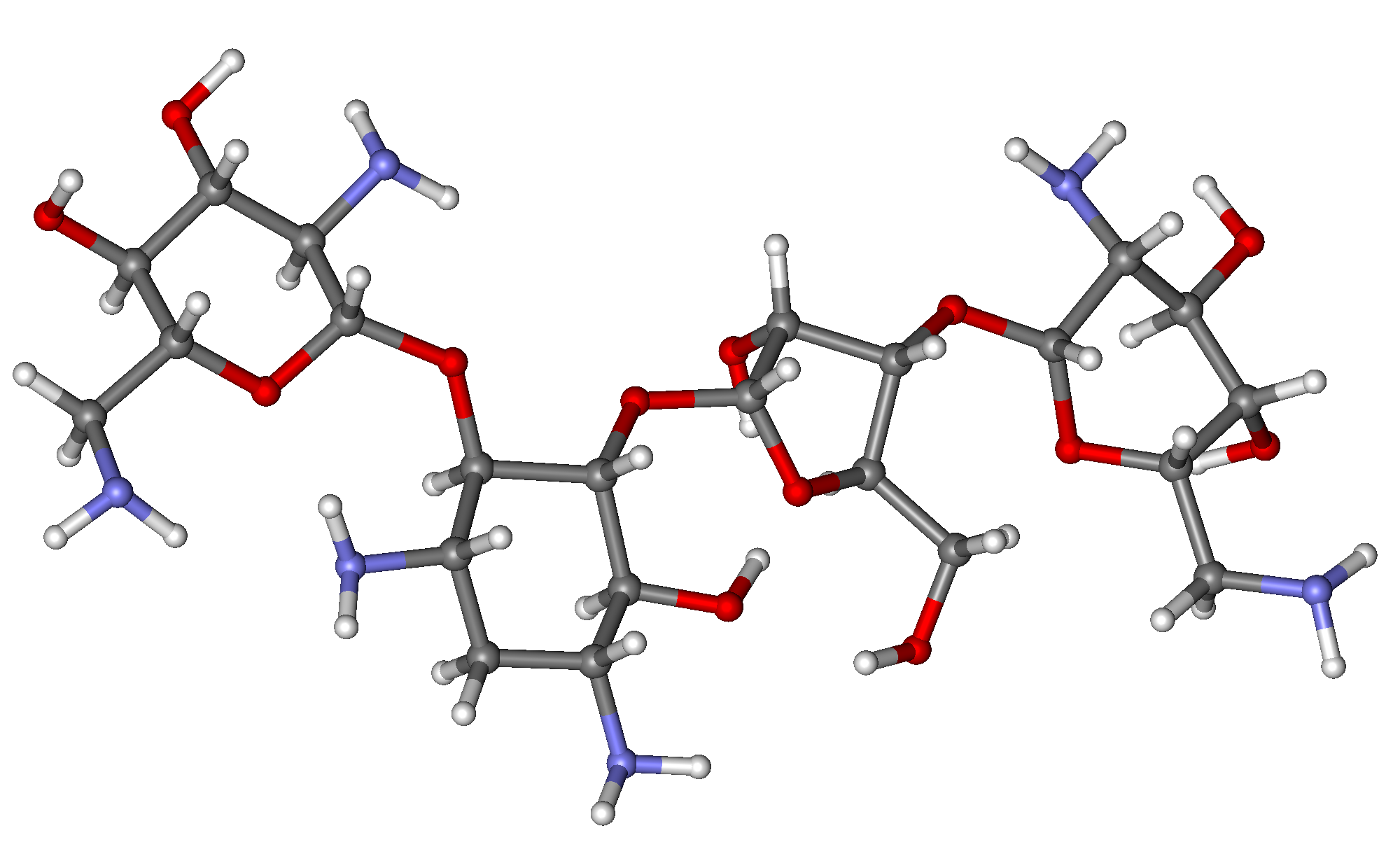

Clinical data
- Trade names: Neo-rx
- AHFS/Drugs.com: Monograph
- MedlinePlus: a682274
- Routes of administration: Topical, oral
- ATC code: A01AB08 (WHO) A07AA01 (WHO), B05CA09 (WHO), D06AX04 (WHO), J01GB05 (WHO), R02AB01 (WHO), S01AA03 (WHO), S02AA07 (WHO), S03AA01 (WHO)

Legal status
- Legal status: US: ℞-only but OTC in Neosporin and similar ointments

Pharmacokinetic data
- Bioavailability: < 3% (oral)
- Protein binding: (Not used systemically)
- Metabolism: (Not used systemically)
- Elimination half-life: 2 to 3 hours

Identifiers
- IUPAC name: (2RS,3S,4S,5R)-5-Amino-2-(aminomethyl)-6-((2R,3S,4R,5S)-5-((1R,2R,5R,6R)-3,5-diamino-2-((2R,3S,4R,5S)-3-amino-6-(aminomethyl)-4,5-dihydroxytetrahydro-2H-pyran-2-yloxy)-6-hydroxycyclohexyloxy)-4-hydroxy-2-(hydroxymethyl)tetrahydrofuran-3-yloxy)tetrahydro-2H-pyran-3,4-diol
- CAS Number: 1404-04-2
- PubChem CID: 8378
- IUPHAR/BPS: 709
- DrugBank: DB00994
- ChemSpider: 8075
- UNII: I16QD7X297
- KEGG: D08260
- ChEBI: CHEBI:7508
- ChEMBL: ChEMBL449118
- ECHA InfoCard: 100.014.333

Chemical and physical data
- Formula: C_{23}H_{46}N_{6}O_{13}
- Molar mass: 614.650 g·mol^{−1}
- 3D model (JSmol): Interactive image
- SMILES: O([C@H]3[C@H](O[C@@H]2O[C@H](CO)[C@@H](O[C@H]1O[C@@H](CN)[C@@H](O)[C@H](O)[C@H]1N)[C@H]2O)[C@@H](O)[C@H](N)C[C@@H]3N)[C@H]4O[C@@H]([C@@H](O)[C@H](O)[C@H]4N)CN
- InChI: InChI=1S/C23H46N6O13/c24-2-7-13(32)15(34)10(28)21(37-7)40-18-6(27)1-5(26)12(31)20(18)42-23-17(36)19(9(4-30)39-23)41-22-11(29)16(35)14(33)8(3-25)38-22/h5-23,30-36H,1-4,24-29H2/t5-,6+,7+,8?,9+,10+,11-,12+,13+,14-,15+,16-,17+,18-,19+,20-,21+,22-,23-/m0/s1; Key:PGBHMTALBVVCIT-DPNHOFNISA-N

Neomycin, also known as framycetin, is an aminoglycoside antibiotic that displays bactericidal activity against Gram-negative aerobic bacilli and some anaerobic bacilli where resistance has not yet arisen. It is generally not effective against Gram-positive bacilli and anaerobic Gram-negative bacilli. Neomycin comes in oral and topical formulations, including creams, ointments, and eyedrops. Neomycin belongs to the aminoglycoside class of antibiotics that contain two or more amino sugars connected by glycosidic bonds.

Neomycin was discovered in 1949 by microbiologist Selman Waksman and his student Hubert Lechevalier at Rutgers University. Neomycin received approval for medical use in 1952. Rutgers University was granted the patent for neomycin in 1957.

== Discovery ==
Neomycin was discovered in 1949 by the microbiologist Selman Waksman and his student Hubert Lechevalier at Rutgers University. It is produced naturally by the bacterium Streptomyces fradiae. Synthesis requires specific nutrient conditions in either stationary or submerged aerobic conditions. The compound is then isolated and purified from the bacterium.

== Medical uses ==
Neomycin is typically applied as a topical preparation, such as Neosporin (neomycin/polymyxin B/bacitracin). In 2023, the topical combination of neomycin with dexamethasone and polymyxin B (neomycin/polymyxin B/hydrocortisone) was the 260th most commonly prescribed medication in the United States, with more than 1 million prescriptions.

The antibiotic can also be administered orally, in which case it is usually combined with other antibiotics. Neomycin is very poorly absorbed from the gastrointestinal tract and mostly stays in the gut, exiting with feces. It has been used as a preventive measure for hepatic encephalopathy and hypercholesterolemia. By killing bacteria in the intestinal tract, Neomycin keeps ammonia levels low and prevents hepatic encephalopathy. Orally administered neomycin has also been used to reduce the risk of post operative infection following gastrointestinal surgery and to treat small intestinal bacterial overgrowth.

Neomycin has good activity against Gram-positive and Gram-negative bacteria, but is ototoxic and nephrotoxic (damaging to kidney function) at doses required to inhibit bacteria even when compared to other aminoglycosides. It is thus not used systemically. Its only use as an injection is when neomycin is included, in small quantities, as a preservative in some vaccines – typically 25 μg per dose.

=== Spectrum ===
Similar to other aminoglycosides, neomycin has excellent activity against Gram-negative bacteria and is partially effective against Gram-positive bacteria. It is relatively toxic to humans, with allergic reactions noted as a common adverse reaction (see: hypersensitivity). Physicians sometimes recommend using antibiotic ointments without neomycin, such as Polysporin. The following represents minimum inhibitory concentration (MIC) susceptibility data for a few medically significant Gram-negative bacteria.

- Enterobacter cloacae: >16 μg/ml
- Escherichia coli: 1 μg/ml
- Proteus vulgaris: 0.25 μg/ml

Waksman and Lechevalier originally noted that neomycin was active against streptomycin-resistant bacteria as well as Mycobacterium tuberculosis, the causative agent for tuberculosis.

== Side effects ==
In 2005–06, Neomycin was the fifth-most-prevalent allergen in patch test results (10.0%). It was named Allergen of the Year in 2010.

Like other aminoglycosides, neomycin has been shown to be ototoxic, causing tinnitus, hearing loss, and vestibular problems in a small number of patients. Neomycin affects the cochlea, which is found in the inner ear. Hearing loss is caused by ear hair cell death, which occurs in response to treatment with neomycin. Routes known to lead to ototoxicity include rectal, parenteral, intrapleural, topical, and oral. Although cases of ototoxicity via the oral route are most commonly associated gastrointestinal inflammation or renal impairment, there have been cases where people with normal function in these organs developed ototoxicity after prolonged use. Patients with existing tinnitus or sensorineural hearing loss are advised to speak with a healthcare practitioner about the risks and side effects prior to taking this medication.

Neomycin is also a known GABA gamma-Aminobutyric acid antagonist and can be responsible for seizures and psychosis, at least in animal models.

== Mechanism of action ==
=== Activity ===
Neomycin's antibacterial activity stems from its binding to the 30S subunit of the prokaryotic ribosome, where it inhibits prokaryotic translation of mRNA.

Neomycin also exhibits a high binding affinity for phosphatidylinositol 4,5-bisphosphate (PIP_{2}), a phospholipid component of cell membranes.

=== Resistance ===
Neomycin resistance is most commonly conferred by a kanamycin kinase gene; the resultant enzyme inactivates the antibiotic by attaching a phosphate group. This gene is variously known as APH (aminoglycoside 3' phosphotransferase) or neo. Currently, research is being performed to understand if derivatives of neomycin can have the same antibiotic effects while still being effective against neomycin-resistant bacteria. Other neomycin-inactivating enzymes also exist.

Specific versions of the neo gene are commonly included in DNA plasmids used to establish stable mammalian cell lines expressing cloned proteins in culture. Although neomycin does not disrupt the eukaryotic ribosome, the related G418 inhibits both prokaryotic and eukaryotic ribosomes and is inactivated by APH/neo. As a result, G418 makes neo a selectable marker usable in both eukaryotes and prokaryotes: by adding it to a cell culture, cells not expressing the marker are killed. Many commercially available protein expression plasmids use this approach.

== Chemistry ==
=== Composition ===
Pharmaceutical grade neomycin is composed of several related compounds including neomycin A, neomycin B, neomycin C, and a few minor compounds found in much lower quantities. Neomycin B is the most active component in neomycin followed by neomycin C, which is about half as active. Neomycin A is an inactive degradation product of the C and B isomers. The quantities of these components in neomycin vary from lot-to-lot depending on the manufacturer and manufacturing process.

Neomycin was first isolated from the Streptomyces fradiae and Streptomyces albogriseus in 1949 (NBRC 12773). This original isolation consists of a mixture of neomycin B (framycetin); and its epimer neomycin C, the latter component accounting for some 5–15% of the mixture.

=== Structure ===
The inactive neomycin A (neamine) consists of two ring moities, both derived from glucose: 2-deoxystreptamine (ring I) and D-neosamine (ring II). Ring I is linked to ring II via a 1→4 glycoside linkage.

Neomycin B and C are 23-carbon molecules with a four-ring structure. Three of the rings are six-membered, and one is five-membered. Neomycin C are stereoisomers of each other and differ by only one stereocenter (C-5‴), one giving the R conformation and the other giving the S conformation. The four rings, from I to IV, of neomycin B (framycetin) are 2-deoxystreptamine (2-DOS), D-neosamine, D-ribose, and L-neosamine. The rings are attached in a II-I-III-IV pattern, specifically using linkages of 1→3 and 1→5 between IV, III, and II and a 1→4 linkage between I and II. Neomycin differs by a flip of the neosamine ring IV, which it has in the original D configuration.

=== Properties ===
Neomycin was described as thermostable and soluble in water (while insoluble in organic solvents) by its discoverers. It is a basic compound that is most active with an alkaline reaction.

== Biosynthetic pathway ==
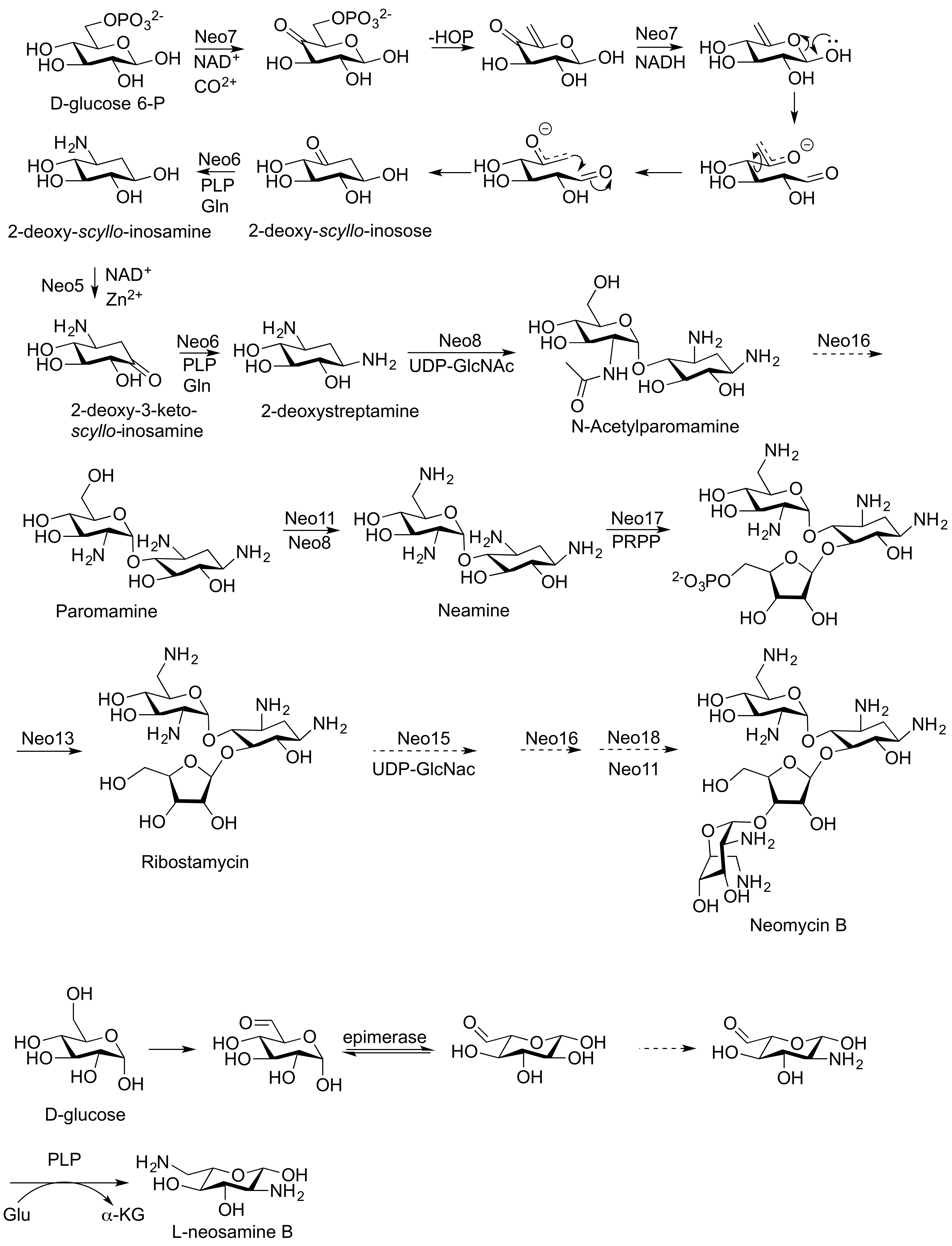
Neomycin B biosynthesis

The biosynthetic gene cluster for neomycin in Streptomyces fradiae has been sequenced and largely analyzed. In broad strokes, the biosynthesis involves:

1. Production of 2-deoxystreptamine from glucose-6-phosphate;
2. Production of the two-ringed 2′-N-acetylparomamine from 2-deoxystreptamine and UDP-N-acetylglucosamine, followed by its modification into neamine (neomycin A);
3. Addition of a ribose group onto neomycin A, plus further modifications to arrive at ribostamycin;
4. Addition of another UDP-N-acetylglucosamine to form the initial four-ringed 6‴-deamino-6‴hydroxyneomyxin, followed by its modification into neomycin C, which is then epimerized into neomycin B.

Three genes that code for enzymes are responsible for the first stepL: (in the order of their action) 2-deoxy-scyllo-inosose synthase (btr/neoC, neo7); a 2-deoxy-scyllo-inosamine dehydrogenase (btr/neoE, neo5); and a L-glutamine:2-deoxy-scyllo-inosose aminotransferase (btr/neoS, neoB, neo6). (In newer literature, the genes are named by neoX instead of btrX with the same letter. The btr designation was inherited from analysis of butirosin biosynthesis, which had homologous genes and served as a basis for the analysis of neomycin biosynthetic genes – one that should not have been directly applied onto the neomycin cluster. There is, however, yet another neoX designation that uses an independent lettering scheme used by UniProt.)

The second step uses a 2-deoxystreptamine N-acetyl-D-glucosaminyltransferase (btr/neoM, neo8; UniProt "neoD") for the initial coupling, followed by a 2'-N-acetylparomamine deacetylase (btr/neoD, neo16; "neoL"), a flavoprotein paromamine 6'-oxidase (btr/neoQ, neo11; "neoG"), and a neamine transaminase (btrB, neo18; "neoN").

The third step is the attachment of the D-ribose via ribosylation of neamine, using 5-phosphoribosyl-1-diphosphate (PRPP) as the ribosyl donor (BtrL, BtrP). This is catalyzed by a UDP-GlcNAc:ribostamycin N-acetylglucosaminyltransferase (btr/neoF, Neo15; "neoK").

The final steps are for the production of neomycins B and C from ribostamycin. Production of the latter from ribostamycin was accomplished using recombinant enzymes in 2009, providing proof for most of the hypothsized pathway. The pathway starts with again neo8 to add the ring, neo16, neo11, and neo18 to convert it to a neosamine, making at this point neomycin C. The SAM-dependent neomycin C epimerase (neoN, "neoH") then converts neomycin C into neomycin B.

Genetic manipulation has been used to improve the efficacy of the epimerization step in order to produce a product with higher neomycin B concentration. The epimerization enzyme resides on a different gene cluster, along with a regulatory gene and an enzyme that produces SAM.

== Additional activities ==
=== DNA binding ===
Aminoglycosides such as neomycin are known for their ability to bind to duplex RNA with high affinity in vitro. The association constant for neomycin with A-site RNA is in the 10^{9} M^{−1} range. However, more than 50 years after its discovery, its DNA-binding properties were still unknown. Neomycin has been shown to induce thermal stabilization of triplex DNA, while having little or almost no effect on the B-DNA duplex stabilization. Neomycin was also shown to bind to structures that adopt an A-form structure, triplex DNA being one of them. Neomycin also includes DNA:RNA hybrid triplex formation.

=== Immunostimulation ===
In 2018, scientists from Yale University found that topical application of aminoglycosides to the mucosa of lab animals increased their ability to resist future challenges by herpes simplex viruses, influenza A virus and Zika virus. Neomycin was one of the more effective aminoglycosides. The authors found that this effect had nothing to do with the local microbiome; instead, aminoglycosides induced interferon-stimulated genes in a way that requires TLR3, TICAM1, IRF3, and IRF7. A reduction in viral replication was also reported in human cell cultures.

An 2024 paper reports additional results from animal experiments. It appears that neomycin not only prevents various viral infections in rodents, but is also useful as a treatment. The paper also reported on a very small human randomized controlled trial where Neosporin was applied into their nostrils and the ISG expression was measured. Although a significant increase in ISGs were seen in the volunteers on average, the increase was very inconsistent from person to person.
