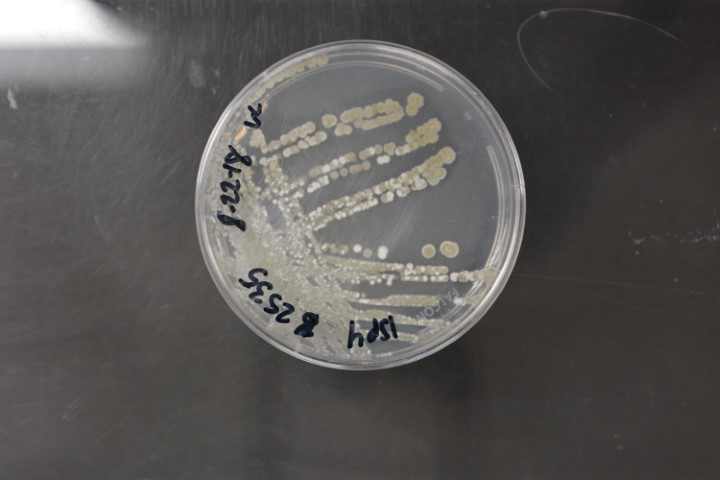

Scientific classification
- Domain: Bacteria
- Kingdom: Bacillati
- Phylum: Actinomycetota
- Class: Actinomycetia
- Order: Streptomycetales
- Family: Streptomycetaceae
- Genus: Streptomyces
- Species: S. kanamyceticus

Binomial name
- Streptomyces kanamyceticus Okami and Umezawa 1957 (Approved Lists 1980)

= Streptomyces kanamyceticus =

Species of bacterium

Streptomyces kanamyceticus is a bacterial species in the genus Streptomyces. It is the species from which the antibiotic kanamycin is isolated.
