= Ribostamycin =

Aminoglycoside antibiotic

Clinical data
- Other names: (2R,3S,4R,5R,6R)-5-amino-2-(aminomethyl)-6-{[(1R,2R,3S,4R,6S)-4,6-diamino-2-{[(2S,3R,4S,5R)-3,4-dihydroxy-5-(hydroxymethyl)oxolan-2-yl]oxy}-3-hydroxycyclohexyl]oxy}oxane-3,4-diol
- AHFS/Drugs.com: International Drug Names
- ATC code: J01GB10 (WHO)

Identifiers
- IUPAC name: (1R,2R,3S,4R,6S)-4,6-diamino-3-hydroxy-2-(β-D-ribofuranosyloxy)cyclohexyl 2,6-diamino-2,6-dideoxy-α-D-glucopyranoside
- CAS Number: 25546-65-0 53797-35-6 (sulfate)
- PubChem CID: 33042
- ChemSpider: 30581
- UNII: 2Q5JOU7T53
- ChEMBL: ChEMBL221572
- CompTox Dashboard (EPA): DTXSID6048541
- ECHA InfoCard: 100.053.421

Chemical and physical data
- Formula: C_{17}H_{34}N_{4}O_{10}
- Molar mass: 454.477 g·mol^{−1}
- 3D model (JSmol): Interactive image
- SMILES: C1[C@H]([C@@H]([C@H]([C@@H]([C@H]1N)O[C@@H]2[C@@H]([C@H]([C@@H]([C@H](O2)CN)O)O)N)O[C@H]3[C@@H]([C@@H]([C@H](O3)CO)O)O)O)N
- InChI: InChI=1S/C17H34N4O10/c18-2-6-10(24)12(26)8(21)16(28-6)30-14-5(20)1-4(19)9(23)15(14)31-17-13(27)11(25)7(3-22)29-17/h4-17,22-27H,1-3,18-21H2/t4-,5+,6-,7-,8-,9+,10-,11-,12-,13-,14-,15-,16-,17+/m1/s1; Key:NSKGQURZWSPSBC-VVPCINPTSA-N

Ribostamycin is an aminoglycoside-aminocyclitol antibiotic isolated from a streptomycete, Streptomyces ribosidificus, originally identified in a soil sample from Tsu City of Mie Prefecture in Japan. It is made up of 3 ring subunits: 2-deoxystreptamine (DOS), neosamine C, and ribose. Ribostamycin, along with other aminoglycosides with the DOS subunit, is an important broad-spectrum antibiotic with important use against human immunodeficiency virus and is considered a critically important antimicrobial by the World Health Organization., Resistance against aminoglycoside antibiotics, such as ribostamycin, is a growing concern. The resistant bacteria contain enzymes that modify the structure through phosphorylation, adenylation, and acetylation and prevent the antibiotic from being able to interact with the bacterial ribosomal RNAs.

== Biosynthesis ==
The biosynthesis of ribostamycin begins with the sugar D-glucose, which is phosphorylated at the 6 position to form glucose-6-phosphate. The enzyme rbmA contains a genetic sequence that corresponds to NAD^{+} binding and catalyzes the formation of 2-deoxy-scyllo-inosose. The enzyme rmbB then catalyzes the transamination of 2-deoxy-scyllo-inosose to 2-deoxy-scyllo-inosamine with L-glutamine and pyridoxal phosphate (PLP). Enzyme rbmC oxidizes the ring to 2-deoxy-3-amino-scyllo-inosose, which is then transaminated by enzyme rmbB to DOS. DOS is then glycosylated by the glycosyltransferase rmbD with uridine diphosphate N-acetylglucosamine (UDP-Glc-NAc) to form 2’-N-acetylparomamine. The deacetylase racJ removes the acetyl group and forms paromamine. Paromamine is oxidized by enzyme rbmG and then enzyme rmbH transaminates to produce neamine. Neamine is then ribosylated to form ribostamycin.

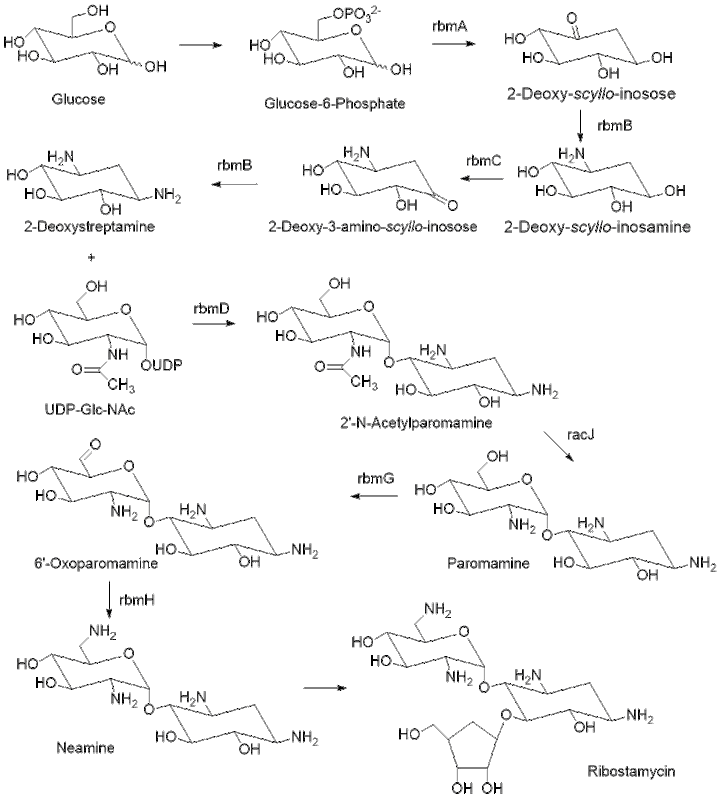
Biosynthetic patway for ribostamycin
