= Butirosin =

Antibiotic complex

Butirosin INN: Butirosin

- Butirosin A (top) and butirosin B (bottom)

Clinical data
- Other names: Ambutyrosin; Butyrosin
- Drug class: Aminoglycoside antibiotic

Identifiers
- CAS Number: 12772-35-9
- PubChem CID: 72393
- ChemSpider: 65326
- UNII: 8S52KR0L58
- KEGG: C01559
- ChEBI: CHEBI:65109
- CompTox Dashboard (EPA): DTXSID60925967

Chemical and physical data
- 3D model (JSmol): Interactive image
- SMILES: C1[C@@H]([C@H]([C@@H]([C@H]([C@@H]1NC(=O)[C@@H](CCN)O)O)O[C@@H]2[C@@H]([C@@H]([C@H](O2)CO)O)O)O[C@@H]3[C@@H]([C@H]([C@@H]([C@H](O3)CN)O)O)N)N
- InChI: InChI=1S/C21H41N5O12/c22-2-1-8(28)19(34)26-7-3-6(24)17(37-20-11(25)15(32)13(30)9(4-23)35-20)18(12(7)29)38-21-16(33)14(31)10(5-27)36-21/h6-18,20-21,27-33H,1-5,22-25H2,(H,26,34)/t6-,7+,8+,9+,10+,11+,12-,13+,14+,15+,16+,17+,18+,20+,21+/m0/s1; Key:XEQLFNPSYWZPOW-NUOYRARPSA-N

Butirosin is an aminoglycoside antibiotic complex which is active against both Gram-positive and Gram-negative bacteria. It is a mixture with butirosin A (80-85%) and butirosin B being the major components.
