= Aminoglycoside =

Antibacterial drug

Streptomycin. 2D line-angle representation.

Aminoglycoside is a medicinal and bacteriologic category of traditional Gram-negative antibacterial medications that inhibit protein synthesis and contain as a portion of the molecule an amino group-containing sugar. The term can also refer more generally to any organic molecule that contains amino sugar substructures. Aminoglycoside antibiotics display bactericidal activity against Gram-negative aerobes and some anaerobic bacilli where resistance has not yet arisen but generally not against Gram-positive and anaerobic Gram-negative bacteria.

Streptomycin is the first-in-class aminoglycoside antibiotic. It is derived from Streptomyces griseus and is the earliest modern agent used against tuberculosis. Streptomycin lacks the common 2-deoxystreptamine moiety (image right, below) present in most other members of this class. Other examples of aminoglycosides include the deoxystreptamine-containing agents kanamycin, tobramycin, gentamicin, and neomycin (see below).

== Nomenclature ==
Chemical structure of 2-deoxystreptamine, 2D representation

Aminoglycosides that are derived from bacteria of the Streptomyces genus are named with the suffix -mycin, whereas those that are derived from Micromonospora are named with the suffix -micin. However, this nomenclature system is not specific for aminoglycosides, and so appearance of this set of suffixes does not imply common mechanism of action. (For instance, vancomycin, a glycopeptide antibiotic, and erythromycin, a macrolide antibiotic produced by Saccharopolyspora erythraea, along with its synthetic derivatives clarithromycin and azithromycin, all share the suffixes but have notably different mechanisms of action.)

In the following gallery, kanamycin A to netilmicin are examples of the 4,6-disubstituted deoxystreptamine sub-class of aminoglycosides, the neomycins are examples of the 4,5-disubstituted sub-class, and streptomycin is an example of a non-deoxystreptamine aminoglycoside.

4,6-Disubstituted deoxystreptamines

Kanamycin A

Amikacin

Tobramycin

Dibekacin

Gentamicin C2

Sisomicin

Netilmicin

Plazomicin
Other aminoglycosides

Neomycins B, C (4,5-disubstituted)

Neomycin E (paromomycin) (4,5-disubstituted)

Streptomycin (non-deoxystreptamine: 4-substituted streptidine)

== Mechanisms of action ==
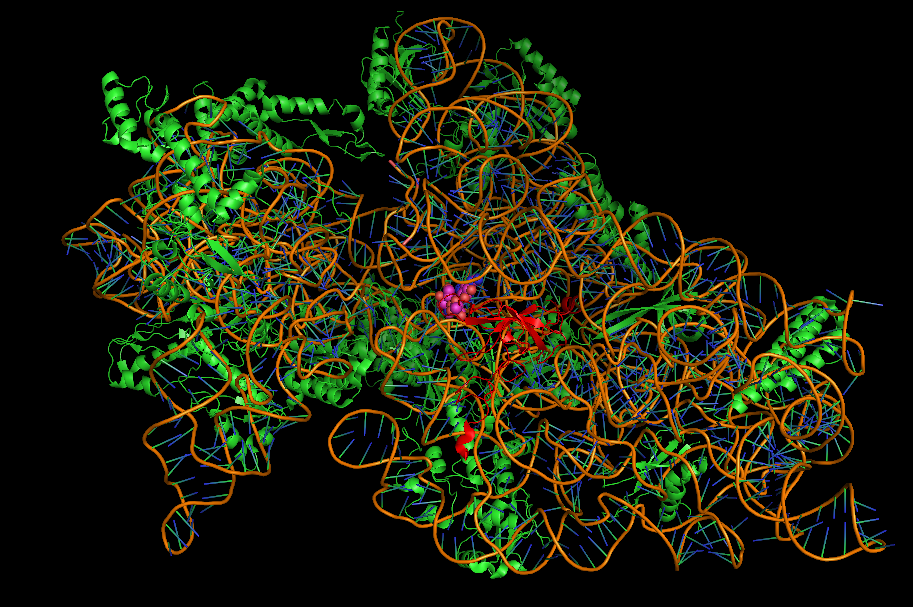
Streptomycin in complex with a bacterial ribosome. X-ray crystallographic structure of the 30S ribosomal subunit with bound drug (purple, space-filling model, at center) protein secondary structure elements such as alpha-helices in bright green, and the RNA phosphodiester backbone shown in orange (and the ladder of base pairs in dark green and blue)

Aminoglycosides display concentration-dependent bactericidal activity against "most gram-negative aerobic and facultative anaerobic bacilli" but not against gram-negative anaerobes and most gram-positive bacteria. They require only short contact time, and are most effective against susceptible bacterial populations that are rapidly multiplying. These activities are attributed to a primary mode of action as protein synthesis inhibitors, though additional mechanisms are implicated for some specific agents, and/or thorough mechanistic descriptions are as yet unavailable.

These agents exhibit a post-antibiotic effect in which there is no or very little drug level detectable in blood, but there still seems to be inhibition of bacterial re-growth. This is due to strong, irreversible binding to the ribosome, and remains intracellular long after plasma levels drop, and allows a prolonged dosage interval. Depending on their concentration, they act as bacteriostatic or bactericidal agents.

=== Inhibition of protein synthesis ===
The inhibition of protein synthesis is mediated through aminoglycosides' energy-dependent, sometimes irreversible binding, to the cytosolic, membrane-associated bacterial ribosome (image at right). (Aminoglycosides first cross bacterial cell walls—lipopolysaccharide in gram-negative bacteria—and cell membranes, where they are actively transported.) While specific steps in protein synthesis affected may vary somewhat between specific aminoglycoside agents, as can their affinity and degree of binding, aminoglycoside presence in the cytosol generally disturbs peptide elongation at the 30S ribosomal subunit, giving rise to inaccurate mRNA translation and therefore biosynthesis of proteins that are truncated, or bear altered amino acid compositions at particular points. Specifically, binding impairs translational proofreading leading to misreading of the RNA message, premature termination, or both, and so to inaccuracy of the translated protein product. The subset of aberrant proteins that are incorporated into the bacterial cell membrane may then lead to changes in its permeability and then to "further stimulation of aminoglycoside transport". The amino sugar portion of this class of molecules (e.g., the 2-deoxystreptamine in kanamycins, gentamicins, and tobramycin, see above) are implicated in the association of the small molecule with ribosomal structures that lead to the infidelities in translation (ibid.). Inhibition of ribosomal translocation—i.e., movement of the peptidyl-tRNA from the A- to the P-site—has also been suggested. Recent single-molecule tracking experiments in live E. coli showed an ongoing but slower protein synthesis upon treatment with different aminoglycoside drugs. (Spectinomycin, a related but distinct chemical structure class often discussed with aminoglycosides, does not induce mRNA misreading and is generally not bactericidal.)

=== Additional antibacterial effects ===
It has been proposed that aminoglycoside antibiotics cause oxidation of guanine nucleotides in the bacterial nucleotide pool, and that this contributes to the cytotoxicity of these antibiotics. The incorporation of oxidized guanine nucleotides into DNA could be bactericidal since incomplete repair of closely spaced 8-oxo-2'-deoxyguanosine in the DNA can result in lethal double-strand breaks.

Finally, a further "cell-membrane effect" also occurs with aminoglycosides; "functional integrity of the bacterial cell membrane" can be lost, later in time courses of aminoglycoside exposure and transport.

=== Spectrum of activity ===
Aminoglycosides are useful primarily in infections involving aerobic, Gram-negative bacteria, such as Pseudomonas, Acinetobacter, and Enterobacter. In addition, some Mycobacteria, including the bacteria that cause tuberculosis, are susceptible to aminoglycosides. Streptomycin was the first effective drug in the treatment of tuberculosis, though the role of aminoglycosides such as streptomycin and amikacin has been eclipsed (because of their toxicity and inconvenient route of administration) except for multiple-drug-resistant strains.

As noted, aminoglycosides are mostly ineffective against anaerobic bacteria, fungi, and viruses. Infections caused by Gram-positive bacteria can also be treated with aminoglycosides, but other types of antibiotics are more potent and less damaging to the host. In the past, the aminoglycosides have been used in conjunction with beta-lactam antibiotics in streptococcal infections for their synergistic effects, in particular in endocarditis. One of the most frequent combinations is ampicillin (a beta-lactam, or penicillin-related antibiotic) and gentamicin. Often, hospital staff refer to this combination as "amp and gent" or more recently called "pen and gent" for penicillin and gentamicin.

=== Antibiotic resistance ===
Aminoglycoside resistance is generally mediated by a resistance gene that inactivates the antibiotic via chemical modification. A wide range of such aminoglycoside modifying enzymes are known, including nucleotidyltranferases, phosphotransferases, or acetyltransferases: all enzymes that attach extra chemical groups to the molecule. New antibiotics have been developed based on the knowledge of some of these enzymes, incorporating structural changes that prevent specific groups of resistance enzymes from modifying the drug.

=== Effects on eukaryotes ===
Most aminoglycosides used as antibiotics are selective for the prokaryotic ribosome, binding to the eukaryotic ribosome with low affinity and largely not interfering with them. Still, some of them show significant effects on eukaryotes such as people and human cell cultures.

==== Nonsense suppression ====
The interference with mRNA proofreading has been exploited to treat genetic diseases that result from premature stop codons (leading to early termination of protein synthesis and truncated proteins). Aminoglycosides can cause the cell to overcome the stop codons, insert a random amino acid, and express a full-length protein.

Gentamicin has been used to treat cystic fibrosis (CF) cells in the laboratory to induce them to grow full-length proteins. CF is caused by a mutation in the gene coding for the cystic fibrosis transmembrane conductance regulator (CFTR) protein. In approximately 10% of CF cases, the mutation in this gene causes its early termination during translation, leading to the formation of a truncated and non-functional CFTR protein. It is believed that gentamicin distorts the structure of the ribosome-RNA complex, leading to a mis-reading of the termination codon, causing the ribosome to "skip" over the stop sequence and to continue with the normal elongation and production of the CFTR protein. In a short randomized controlled trial, CF patients receiving gentamicin showed better electrophysiological parameters after treatment.

==== Cell selection ====
G418 is an aminoglycoside potent enough to kill mammalian cells. It is used in cell biology as a selective agent, killing off cells that have not taken up a resistance gene. When a genetic construct is inserted into a cell using a vector, biologists often use such a resistance gene as a selectable marker, allowing them to use a poison such as G418 to only keep the cells that have taken up the vector.

== Routes of administration ==
Since they are not absorbed from the gut, they are administered intravenously and intramuscularly. Some are used in topical preparations for wounds. Oral administration can be used for gut decontamination (e.g., in hepatic encephalopathy). Tobramycin may be administered in a nebulized form.

== Clinical use ==
The most frequent use of aminoglycosides is empiric therapy for serious infections such as sepsis, complicated intra-abdominal infections, complicated urinary tract infections, and nosocomial respiratory tract infections. Usually, once cultures of the causal organism are grown and their susceptibilities tested, aminoglycosides are discontinued in favor of less toxic antibiotics.

The recent emergence of infections due to Gram-negative bacterial strains with advanced patterns of antimicrobial resistance has prompted physicians to reevaluate the use of these antibacterial agents. This revived interest in the use of aminoglycosides has brought back to light the debate on the two major issues related to these compounds, namely the spectrum of antimicrobial susceptibility and toxicity. Current evidence shows that aminoglycosides do retain activity against the majority of Gram-negative clinical bacterial isolates in many parts of the world. Still, the relatively frequent occurrence of nephrotoxicity and ototoxicity during aminoglycoside treatment makes physicians reluctant to use these compounds in everyday practice. Recent advances in the understanding of the effect of various dosage schedules of aminoglycosides on toxicity have provided a partial solution to this problem, although more research still needs to be done in order to overcome this problem entirely.

Aminoglycosides are in pregnancy category D, that is, there is positive evidence of human fetal risk based on adverse reaction data from investigational or marketing experience or studies in humans, but potential benefits may warrant use of the drug in pregnant women despite potential risks.

=== Pharmacokinetics ===
There is a significant variability in the relationship between the dose administered and the resultant plasma level in blood. Therapeutic drug monitoring (TDM) is necessary to obtain the correct dose.

== Adverse effects ==
Aminoglycosides can cause inner ear toxicity which can result in sensorineural hearing loss. The incidence of inner ear toxicity varies from 7 to 90%, depending on the types of antibiotics used, susceptibility of the patient to such antibiotics, and the duration of antibiotic administration.

Another serious and disabling side effect of aminoglycoside use is vestibular ototoxicity. This leads to oscillopsia (gaze instability) and balance impairments that impact all aspects of an individual's antigravity function. This loss is permanent and can happen at any dose.

Frequent use of aminoglycosides could result in kidney damage (acute kidney injury) that could lead to chronic kidney disease.

== Contraindication for specific diseases ==
Aminoglycosides can exacerbate weakness in patients with myasthenia gravis, and use is therefore avoided in these patients.

Aminoglycosides are contraindicated in patients with mitochondrial diseases as they may result in impaired mtDNA translation, which can lead to irreversible hearing loss, tinnitus, cardiac toxicity, and renal toxicity. However, hearing loss and tinnitus have also been observed in some patients without mitochondrial diseases.
