= Phumeza Tisile =

South African tuberculosis activist

- Born: 1990 (age 35–36); South Africa
- Occupation: Advocacy Officer

Phumeza Tisile is a healthcare activist from South Africa who advocates for making tuberculosis medication inexpensive and widely available. Tisile survived extensively drug-resistant tuberculosis (XDR-TB), enduring three years and 8 months of treatment. Tisile's initial misdiagnoses led to months of incorrect treatment, which caused her to become deaf. As an activist, Tisile advocates for improved access to tuberculosis (TB) diagnosis and treatment, improved counseling for patients, research into better treatments, and elimination of TB stigma.

== Early life and education ==
Tisile was born in Port Elizabeth, which is now called Gqeberha. She moved with her mother Nokuzola to Khayelitsha, outside Cape Town, South Africa, when she was 6. Her father remained in Port Elizabeth to work. Tisile enjoyed attending school, running, drama, and climbing.

Tisile was studying human resources at Cape Peninsula University of Technology when she was diagnosed with tuberculosis. She had to leave school during treatment. In 2017, she returned to university, and she received a bachelor's degree in Social Sciences from the University of Cape Town in 2019. Tisile expressed interest in pursuing a PhD, but said "I keep trying to go back to study but then work just piles up... maybe this is my calling."

== Tuberculosis ==
When Tisile was a first year student at Cape Peninsula University of Technology in 2010, she developed tuberculosis symptoms, including rapid weight loss and fatigue. Because she did not have night sweats or constant coughing, doctors sent her home with pain/fever medication and cough syrup. After three weeks, her sputum smear test came back negative for tuberculosis. She was later diagnosed with TB after a positive chest x-ray.

Tisile received three years and eight months of tuberculosis treatment. Tisile was first treated with first line TB treatment, which was ineffective. In May 2010, she was diagnosed with drug-resistant tuberculosis, and in the summer she was diagnosed with multi-drug resistant tuberculosis (MDR-TB). She was diagnosed with pneumothorax and infected glands in the lungs. She underwent surgery to remove fluid from her lungs, during which two of her ribs were broken and one of her lungs collapsed. Doctors told her she had a 20% chance of survival, and that she should consult with a priest. She received kanamycin injections, which were ineffective, and she was diagnosed with pre-extensively drug-resistant tuberculosis. The kanamycin treatment caused Tisile to become deaf, which happened suddenly in October 2010. Tisile was not warned about the risk of deafness. Tisile took 20+ pills and 2 injections per day, plus supplements, and she would vomit daily. Tisile took 20,000 pills over her course of treatment.

In 2011, she was diagnosed with extensively drug-resistant tuberculosis (XDR-TB). In mid-2011, Tisile met Jennifer Hughes, a doctor from Médecins Sans Frontières who designed an individually tailored XDR-TB regimen for Tisile. After receiving a combination of linezolid and other drugs, Tisile completed treatment on 29 August 2013.

Tisile maintained a blog on the Médecins Sans Frontières (MSF) website chronicling her treatment, in which she maintained hope for survival and praised MSF and the Lizo Nobanda clinic where she was treated. Tisile also spoke highly of the nurses who treated her at Brooklyn Chest Hospital under limited resources. In October 2014, Tisile learned that she was a good candidate for cochlear implants, she crowdfunded US$40,000 for the surgery, and she was fitted in March 2015.

== Activism ==
Tisile has been open about her tuberculosis experience, starting with her MSF blog during treatment, and continuing to the present. Tisile co-wrote, "Test Me, Treat Me: A Drug-resistant TB Manifesto" in 2013. The manifesto called for universal access to diagnosis and treatment for drug-resistant TB, research to find shorter, less toxic, and more effective treatments, and funding to increase care and research. The petition attached to the manifesto received 55,000 signatures. Tisile delivered the petition to Dr. Mario Raviglione, director of the WHO Global TB department, at the World Health Assembly at the United Nations, Geneva on 21 May 2014. Tisile attended many global meetings on TB, including the second United Nations High-Level meeting on TB in 2023 and the Union World Conference on Lung Health in 2023.

Starting in 2015, Tisile's work as a Research Assistant and Advocacy Officer at TB Proof focused on reducing the stigma that people with TB experience. Tisile advocates for better diagnosis, shorter treatments, better vaccines, and drugs with fewer side effects, effectively persuading South Africa to stop using kanamycin. She advocates for better counseling for people living with TB. Tisile only knew about TB from uncles who worked as miners in Johannesburg, and received insufficient counseling from doctors about treatment and side effects of medications. Her research explores the intersection between tuberculosis, mental health, and substance use.

Tisile has advocated for patient access to XDR-TB drugs including linezolid and bedaquiline. Tisile's successful treatment relied on linezolid, which was expensive in South Africa, at €35,000 (£27,760, US$47,323) per patient a two-year course, not including the other drugs in the cocktail. Owned by Pfizer, generic linezolid was not available in South Africa. In October 2013, Tisile marched with health activists to the department of trade and industry in Pretoria to advocate for changes to South Africa's patent laws that would expand access to essential drugs like linezolid via generics.

Tisile worked to increase access to generic bedaquiline, another XDR-TB drug. Working with MSF, Tisile and Nandita Venkatesan filed a petition with the Indian government to deny Johnson & Johnson's (J&J) secondary patent on bedaquiline in 2019. In March 2023, India rejected the secondary patent, enabling generic alternatives in India after the patent expired in July 2023. Tisile continued to push J&J to allow generic competition worldwide.

Tisile worked to expand access to rapid diagnosis through the Time for $5 Coalition.

== Awards ==
In 2023, Tisile was named one of the Time100 Next along with Nandita Venkatesan for her work to increase access to generic bedaquiline.
