= Totally drug-resistant tuberculosis =

Tuberculosis that is resistant to more drugs than XDR-TB

Totally drug-resistant tuberculosis (TDR-TB) is a generic term for tuberculosis strains that are resistant to a wider range of drugs than strains classified as extensively drug-resistant tuberculosis. Extensively drug resistant tuberculosis is tuberculosis that is resistant to isoniazid and rifampicin, any fluoroquinolone, and any of the three second line injectable TB drugs (amikacin, capreomycin, and kanamycin). TDR-TB has been identified in three countries; India, Iran, and Italy. The term was first presented in 2006, in which it showed that TB was resistant to many second line drugs and possibly all the medicines used to treat the disease. Lack of testing made it unclear which drugs the TDR-TB were resistant to.

The emergence of TDR-TB has been documented in four major publications. However, it is not recognized by the World Health Organization. This is because the term defined as "totally drug resistant" has not been applied to the disease of tuberculosis. Certain strains of TB have not been properly tested to be deemed resistant due to lack of in vitro testing.

TDR-TB has resulted from further mutations within the bacterial genome to confer resistance, beyond those seen in XDR- and MDR-TB. Development of resistance is associated with poor management of cases. As of 2011, drug susceptibility testing is done in less than 5% of TB cases globally Without testing to determine drug resistance profiles, MDR- or XDR-TB patients may develop resistance to additional drugs and can continue to spread the disease to others. TDR-TB is relatively poorly documented, as many countries do not test patient samples against a broad enough range of drugs to diagnose such a comprehensive array of resistance. The United Nations' Special Programme for Research and Training in Tropical Diseases has set up the TDR Tuberculosis Specimen Bank to archive specimens of TDR-TB.

There have been a few examples of cases in several countries, including India, Iran, and Italy. Cases of TDR-TB have also been reported in the United States. The first case was found in a young man from Peru named Oswaldo Juarez. Juarez was in the United States for school and to study the English language. About a year later he was voluntarily sent to A.G. Holley State Hospital. They treated him with unconventional drugs that are not usually used for TB in extremely high doses. He stayed in that hospital for over nineteen months, but left cured of TB.

== See also ==
- Extensively drug-resistant tuberculosis (XDR-TB)
- Multidrug-resistant tuberculosis (MDR-TB)
