= Mycobacteroides franklinii =

Scientific classification
- Domain: Bacteria
- Kingdom: Bacillati
- Phylum: Actinomycetota
- Class: Actinomycetes
- Order: Mycobacteriales
- Family: Mycobacteriaceae
- Genus: Mycobacteroides
- Species: M. franklinii

Binomial name
- Mycobacteroides franklinii (Nogueira et al. 2015) Gupta et al. 2018

Type strain
- ATCC BAA-2149; CV002; DSM 45524

Synonyms
- "Mycobacterium franklinii" Simmon et al. 2011; Mycobacterium franklinii Nogueira et al. 2015

Species of bacterium

Mycobacteroides franklinii (formerly Mycobacterium franklinii) is a species of bacteria from the phylum Actinomycetota belonging to the genus Mycobacteroides. Most of the original strains were isolated from clinical specimens in Pennsylvania, but some have been found in conduit water in the Netherlands. In general, human M. franklinii infections present with symptoms similar to an infection with Mycobacteroides abscessus, but it can also be associated with tattoo infections. M. franklinii is also associated with outbreaks of mycobacteriosis in farmed fish. M. fanklinii is susceptible to cefoxitin and bedaquiline.
