= Mycobacteroides saopaulense =

Scientific classification
- Domain: Bacteria
- Kingdom: Bacillati
- Phylum: Actinomycetota
- Class: Actinomycetes
- Order: Mycobacteriales
- Family: Mycobacteriaceae
- Genus: Mycobacteroides
- Species: M. saopaulense

Binomial name
- Mycobacteroides saopaulense (Nogueira et al. 2015) Gupta et al. 2018

Type strain
- CCUG 66554; EPM 10906; INCQS 733; LMG 28586

Synonyms
- Mycobacterium saopaulense Nogueira et al. 2015

Species of bacterium

Mycobacteroides saopaulense (formerly Mycobacterium saopaulense) is a species of bacteria from the phylum Actinomycetota belonging to the genus Mycobacteroides that was first isolated from a human patient undergoing LASIK surgery. It has also been isolated from turtles and cows. A strain isolated from mangroves has been demonstrated to produce clavulanic acid and streptomycin. The genome of M. saopaulense contains a tRNA array that contains a long non-coding RNA called GOLDD. M. saopaulense is susceptible to amikacin, kanamycin, and clarithromycin.
