= Sorfequiline =

Investigational drug

Clinical data
- Other names: TBAJ-876

Identifiers
- IUPAC name: (1R,2S)-1-(6-bromo-2-methoxyquinolin-3-yl)-2-(2,6-dimethoxy-4-pyridinyl)-4-(dimethylamino)-1-(2,3,6-trimethoxy-4-pyridinyl)butan-2-ol
- CAS Number: 2332841-25-3
- PubChem CID: 155510360
- IUPHAR/BPS: 13132
- DrugBank: DB18807
- ChemSpider: 107448159
- UNII: OYN1GF5B1M
- ChEMBL: ChEMBL4553146
- PDB ligand: YGR (PDBe, RCSB PDB)

Chemical and physical data
- Formula: C_{31}H_{37}BrN_{4}O_{7}
- Molar mass: 657.562 g·mol^{−1}
- 3D model (JSmol): Interactive image
- SMILES: CN(C)CC[C@@](C1=CC(=NC(=C1)OC)OC)([C@H](C2=CC(=NC(=C2OC)OC)OC)C3=C(N=C4C=CC(=CC4=C3)Br)OC)O
- InChI: InChI=InChI=1S/C31H37BrN4O7/c1-36(2)12-11-31(37,19-15-24(38-3)34-25(16-19)39-4)27(21-17-26(40-5)35-30(43-8)28(21)41-6)22-14-18-13-20(32)9-10-23(18)33-29(22)42-7/h9-10,13-17,27,37H,11-12H2,1-8H3/t27-,31-/m1/s1; Key:HHDDKDPLFXIPBX-DLFZDVPBSA-N

Sorfequiline is an investigational new drug that is being evaluated by Global Alliance for TB Drug Development for the treatment of tuberculosis. It is an adenosine triphosphatase inhibitor.

Sorfequiline is a next generation diarylquinoline mycobacterial ATP synthase inhibitor. Compared to bedaquiline, it is claimed to have greater potency and reduced cardiac QT prolongation.

== Clinical trials ==
It is currently in phase 2 clinical trials.
