= Mycobacteroides =

Scientific classification
- Domain: Bacteria
- Kingdom: Bacillati
- Phylum: Actinomycetota
- Class: Actinomycetes
- Order: Mycobacteriales
- Family: Mycobacteriaceae
- Genus: Mycobacteroides; Gupta et al. 2018

Type species
- Mycobacteroides abscessus (Moore and Frerichs 1953) Gupta et al. 2018

Species
- M. abscessus (Moore and Frerichs 1953) Gupta et al. 2018; M. chelonae (Bergey et al. 1923) Gupta et al. 2018; M. franklinii (Nogueira et al. 2015) Gupta et al. 2018; M. immunogenum (Wilson et al. 2001) Gupta et al. 2018; M. salmoniphilum (Whipps et al. 2007) Gupta et al. 2018; M. saopaulense (Nogueira et al. 2015) Gupta et al. 2018

Synonyms
- M. chelonae–M. abscessus group (MCAG); Mycobacterium chelonae–abscessus complex (MCAC)

Genus of bacteria

Mycobacteroides is a genus of Gram-positive rod-shaped bacteria in the family Mycobacteriaceae from the order Mycobacteriales.

Members of Mycobacteroides were demarcated from the larger genus Mycobacterium in 2018 by Gupta et al. based on evidence from various phylogenetic trees constructed based on conserved genome sequences, comparative genomic analyses and average amino acid identity values. In addition to this genus, the study proposed the division of Mycobacterium into a total of five distinct genera, which was met with some resistance by some of the scientific community. The resistance was based on the grounds that Mycobacterium contains some clinically relevant species and name changes might cause confusion among clinicians and other researchers.

In 2020, Yamada et al. analyzed the fundamental morphological properties of the new genera, including the cell diameter, cell length, cell perimeter, cell circularity and aspect ratio, and determined that there were significant differences between the five genera, thus supporting the new division.

The name Mycobacteroides is derived from the Latin noun Mycobacterium (referring to the bacterial genus) and the Latin suffix "-oides" (translates to "resembling"). Together the name refers to a genus resembling Mycobacterium.

== Biochemical characteristics and molecular signatures ==
Members of Mycobacteroides form colonies in less than seven days. Characteristics of this genus include: negative for nitrate reductase, iron uptake and resistance to polymyxin B. Their optimal growth temperature is 30 °C, although growth can occur at 35 °C. Members also demonstrate a positive result for the three-day arylsulfatase test. The genome size for Mycobacteroides species are between 4.5 and 5.6 Mbp, and their G+C content is between 63.9 and 64.8 mol%. Some species are pathogenic and demonstrated to be involved in infections of the lung, skin and soft tissues. In addition, some species are also resistant to several antimicrobial drugs.

Twenty-seven conserved signature indels (CSIs) were identified as uniquely present in this genus in proteins such as DEAD/DEAH box helicase, anion transporter, a membrane protein, nicotinate-nucleotide adenylyltransferase, CoA ester lyase, uracil phosphoribosyltransferase, L-histidine N(alpha)-methyltransferase, DUF58 domain-containing protein, NADH-quinone oxidoreducatase subunit G, ATP-dependent helicase, tRNA (cytidine(34)-2′-O)-methyltransferase, glutamine-fructose-6-phosphate transaminase (isomerizing), error-prone DNA polymerase, and 2-amino-4-hydroxy-6-hydroxymethyldihydropteridine diphosphokinase. These molecular signatures were identified through analyses of genome sequences from Mycobacteroides species and provide a reliable molecular method for distinguishing this genus from theoretical other genera within the family Mycobacteriaceae and all other bacteria. Additionally, 24 unique conserved signature proteins (CSPs) were identified for this genus.

Whole-genome sequencing is the best way to distinguish members of this genus from each other.

== Phylogeny ==
The phylogeny of Mycobacteroides is based on whole-genome analysis.

- - Mycobacteroides
    - - Mycobacteroides chelonae
      - Mycobacteroides salmoniphilum
    - - - Mycobacteroides franklinii
        - - Mycobacteroides immunogenum
          - Mycobacteroides abscessus
      - Mycobacteroides saopaulense
  - Mycolicibacterium (outgroup)
