= Diarylquinoline =

Class of bacteria

- Drug class
- Bedaquiline is the founding member of this class

Class identifiers
- Use: Anti-tuberculosis drug
- Mechanism of action: Inhibitor
- Biological target: subunit c of ATP synthase
- Chemical class: Diarylquinoline

External links
- MeSH: D064687

Legal status

Diarylquinolines (DARQs) are a chemical class of drugs that treat tuberculosis. They target subunit c of mycobacterial ATP synthase, inhibiting the enzyme so Mycobacterium tuberculosis cannot synthesise ATP. This effectively kills the bacteria.

Although ATP synthase in bacteria is similar to its eukaryotic analogue, diarylquinoline agents (such as TMC207) are very specific to the bacterial enzyme, so were expected to be safe for use in humans and other eukaryotes. This also suggests that bacterial ATP synthase inhibition is an attractive therapeutic target.

== Examples ==
=== Bedaquiline ===
Bedaquiline (previously TMC207) is a 1,4-diaryl quinoline (phenyl and naphthyl). US FDA approval in 2012. As of 2014, the only licensed indication of the drug bedaquiline is in the treatment of multi-drug-resistant tuberculosis, primarily due to concerns about safety.

=== Sorfequiline ===
Sorfequiline (previously TBAJ876) is a next generation diarylquinoline mycobacterial ATP synthase inhibitor claimed to have greater potency and reduced cardiac QT prolongation. It is currently in phase 2 clinical trials.

== Synthesis of 1,4-diarylquinolines ==
The reaction of aryl aldehyde, malonodinitrile, and 3‐arylamino‐5,5‐dimethylcyclohex‐2‐enone can produce 1,4-diarylquinolines.

== Synthesis of 2,4-diarylquinolines ==
The reaction of enamides and imines can produce hetero aromatic quinoline derivatives.
