= Mycobacteroides salmoniphilum =

Scientific classification
- Domain: Bacteria
- Kingdom: Bacillati
- Phylum: Actinomycetota
- Class: Actinomycetes
- Order: Mycobacteriales
- Family: Mycobacteriaceae
- Genus: Mycobacteroides
- Species: M. salmoniphilum

Binomial name
- Mycobacteroides salmoniphilum (Whipps et al. 2007) Gupta et al. 2018

Type strain
- ATCC 13758; DSM 43276; SC

Synonyms
- "Mycobacterium salmoniphilum" Ross 1960; Mycobacterium salmoniphilum (ex Ross 1960) Whipps et al. 2007

Species of bacterium

Mycobacteroides salmoniphilum (formerly Mycobacterium salmoniphilum) is a species of bacteria from the phylum Actinomycetota belonging to the genus Mycobacteroides. It was first identified as the causative agent of mycobacteriosis in chinook salmon and steelhead trout, but has since been found to cause disease in Atlantic cod, Atlantic salmon, burbot, coho salmon, freshwater ornamental fish, and Russian sturgeon. It has also been isolated from tap water. It is not known to infect humans. M. salmoniphilum is susceptible to amikacin.
