= 2007 tuberculosis scare =

International health scare

The 2007 tuberculosis scare occurred when a personal-injury lawyer from Atlanta, Andrew "Drew" Speaker, while infected with multidrug-resistant tuberculosis (MDR-TB), flew on several international flights bound for France, Greece, Italy, Czech Republic and Canada, before returning to the United States. The Centers for Disease Control and Prevention believed at the time that Speaker was suffering from extensively drug-resistant tuberculosis (XDR-TB), but failed to inform Speaker of this worsened sickness before his travels abroad. The incident sparked a debate in Congress on the failure of federal customs agents to stop him. Upon Speaker's return to the United States, the CDC placed him under involuntary isolation (similar to quarantine) using a provision of the Public Health Service Act. With this action, Speaker became the first individual subjected to a CDC isolation order since 1963.

== Background ==
In January 2007, Speaker suffered a fall and went to the doctor, concerned that he had bruised a rib. Doctors X-rayed his chest and found an abnormality that required further testing.

On March 28, 2007, his doctors and the health department believed the tuberculosis (TB) strain that Speaker had was a resistant one and communicated this to the CDC. On May 1 the apparent MDR TB infection was discussed with the CDC lab by his doctors and they discussed discontinuing the treatment he was on at that time. On May 9 the suspicion of MDR TB was confirmed. A meeting was held with Fulton County Health Officials, his doctors, his fiancée, as well as his father and father-in-law on May 10, 2007. During this meeting, Speaker was informed that while he was not considered contagious or a threat to other, he would need to travel to Denver for treatment. After weeks of arranging this, he was still advised—or in some accounts—strongly recommended, not to travel.

== Travel sequence ==
On May 12, 2007, Speaker flew from the U.S. to Paris. On May 14, he flew on to Athens and, two days later, flew to the Aegean holiday island of Santorini for his wedding. Speaker then flew to Rome for his honeymoon.

Doctors say that only after Speaker left the United States did they realize he likely had XDR-TB. Speaker says that he was informed of MDR TB before leaving the country, and that while officials preferred him not to fly, they said that he was not a threat and was not required to wear a mask. Once Speaker was in Europe, however, test results showed his strain of tuberculosis was even rarer than originally thought, leading public health officials to try to persuade Speaker to turn himself in to Italian health authorities. The CDC informed him that there were no options for the CDC to get him home, and that he would have to arrange private transportation. Speaker instead flew by commercial jet to Prague and then on to Montréal. Both Speaker and his new wife claimed that, had they been offered transport, they would have accepted it and would have waited in Rome. Speaker has also said that the CDC told him they were going to send officials to put him in Italian quarantine for up to two years, and that he was not told special transportation was arranged.

Once in Montréal, Speaker rented a car and drove across the Canada–United States border. A Customs and Border Protection Officer, after passing Speaker's passport through the Treasury Enforcement Communications System (TECS), failed to detain him at the frontier despite a warning to hold the traveler, wear a protective mask when dealing with him, and call health authorities, stating that Speaker "did not look sick".

== Flight itinerary ==
According to the CDC, Speaker flew on the following flights:

Flight Itinerary of U.S. Traveler
Airlines	Flight#	Aircraft	Date	Departing	Scheduled Departure	Calculated Scheduled Duration	Arriving	Number of Passengers	Patient Seat Row Number
Air France / Delta	385 / 8517	Boeing 747-400	2007-05-12	Atlanta, Georgia	8:45 PM Local	8 Hr 27 Min	Paris, France	433	30
Air France	1232	Airbus A320	2007-05-14	Paris, France	7:35 AM Local	3 Hr 11 Min	Athens, Greece	not more than 172	unknown
Olympic Air	560	ATR 72-202	2007-05-16	Athens, Greece	7:25 PM Local	0 Hr 40 Min	Thira Island, Greece	not more than 74	unknown
Olympic Air	655	ATR 72-202	2007-05-21	Mykonos Island, Greece	1:45 PM Local	0 Hr 40 Min	Athens, Greece	not more than 74	unknown
Olympic Air	239	Boeing 737-400	2007-05-21	Athens, Greece	5:30 PM Local	2 Hr 05 Min	Rome, Italy	not more than 168	unknown
Czech Airlines	727	Boeing 737-400	2007-05-24	Rome, Italy	8:50 AM Local	1 Hr 55 Min	Prague, Czech Republic	not more than 168	unknown
Czech Airlines	0104	Airbus A310	2007-05-24	Prague, Czech Republic	12:25 PM Local	8 Hr 25 Min	Montreal, Canada	191	12

== Tuberculosis case notes ==
On May 31, 2007, Speaker was moved from Grady Memorial Hospital in Atlanta to the National Jewish Medical and Research Center in Denver, Colorado, for further treatment.

It was reported that Speaker's father-in-law, Robert C. Cooksey, works for the Centers for Disease Control and Prevention and is a microbiologist who has conducted research on tuberculosis, according to his CDC biography posted on the agency's Web site.

== Aftermath ==
Wearing a medical mask, Speaker was interviewed by Diane Sawyer on the June 1 edition of the American talk show Good Morning America on ABC and apologized to all passengers, explaining that he had not intended to endanger them.

On July 4, 2007, the National Jewish Medical and Research Center announced, and the CDC confirmed, that Speaker's earlier diagnosis was incorrect and that he instead had multidrug-resistant tuberculosis (MDR-TB), a more treatable form of tuberculosis. On July 26, 2007, Speaker was discharged after undergoing surgery to remove infected lung tissue and receiving antibiotic treatment. A statement by his physicians said that he was no longer contagious, showed no detectable evidence of infection, and that he would continue antibiotic therapy for approximately two years.

In 2007, seven Canadians and two Czechs sued Speaker in Montreal Superior Court; eight of the plaintiffs were on the same flight as Andrew Speaker and one was related to one of the passengers.

In 2009, Speaker sued the CDC for invasion of privacy, claiming that the release of his personal and medical information caused significant harm to his reputation and marriage. The lawsuit was dismissed later in 2009 by a U.S. District Court judge, revived in 2010 by the 11th U.S. Circuit Court of Appeals, and finally dismissed again in 2012 by a U.S. District Court judge.

== Isolation and law ==
Speaker was in New York when the CDC served him with an isolation order but CDC director Julie Gerberding stated that the government was legally constrained prior to that order. The federal statute under section 361 of the Public Health Service Act grants the federal government the ability to isolate or quarantine individuals but only those coming into the country from a foreign nation or territory.

Georgia TB law may have required Speaker to be confined for two weeks and only allowed travel for medical appointments. A court confinement order can isolate a patient only after the infected patient ignores medical advice. This method can be overridden by a declaration of public health emergency by the governor of Georgia.

== See also ==
- Progress of the SARS outbreak for a comparison to another news-worthy international quarantining incident, 2002–2004
