= Mycobacteroides immunogenum =

Scientific classification
- Domain: Bacteria
- Kingdom: Bacillati
- Phylum: Actinomycetota
- Class: Actinomycetia
- Order: Mycobacteriales
- Family: Mycobacteriaceae
- Genus: Mycobacteroides
- Species: M. immunogenum

Binomial name
- Mycobacteroides immunogenum (Wilson et al. 2001) Gupta et al. 2018

Type strain
- ATCC 700505; BH29; DSM 45594; DSM 45595; MC 779

Synonyms
- Mycobacterium immunogenum Wilson et al. 2001

Species of bacterium

Mycobacteroides immunogenum (formerly Mycobacterium immunogenum) is a species of bacteria from the phylum Actinomycetota, belonging to the genus Mycobacteroides.

These non-tuberculous mycobacteria are sometimes found in fouling water-based cutting fluids, often causing hypersensitivity pneumonitis to the machinists in the affected grinding plants.

The complete genome sequence of Mycobacteroides immunogenum CCUG 47286^{T} was deposited and published in DNA Data Bank of Japan, European Nucleotide Archive, and GenBank in 2016 under the accession number CP011530.
