= Koen Andries =

Belgian scientist

- Education: University of Ghent
- Occupations: Janssen Pharmaceutica and professor at the University of Antwerp

Koen Andries is a Belgian Janssen Pharmaceutica scientist and professor at the University of Antwerp. In 2005 he and his team published a discovery about a new di-Aryl-Quinoline-based drug (R207910), now called bedaquiline, which promises a shorter and simpler treatment for drug resistant Tuberculosis (TB).

== Career ==
Andries graduated as a Veterinarian and obtained a PhD at the University of Ghent (Ghent, Belgium) in 1975. He continued his career at the university until 1982, when he started working at Janssen Pharmaceutica in Beerse until 2004. In 2004 he continued his research at Tibotec in Mechelen.

== Recognition ==
- 2014 winner of the European Inventor Award in the Industry category awarded by the European Patent Office.
