= Polysulfated glycosaminoglycan =

Injectable drug

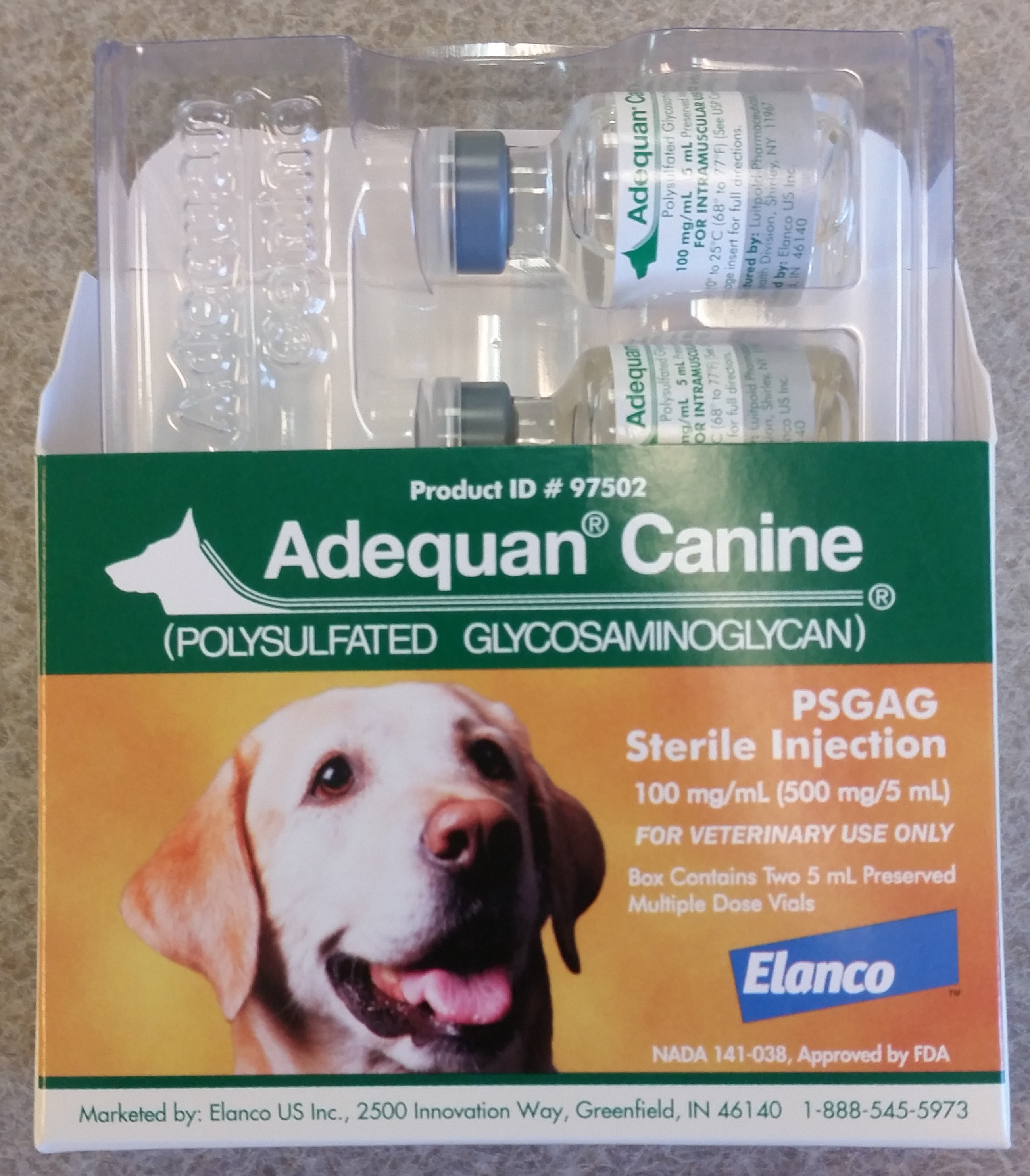
- Chemical structure and packaging

Clinical data
- Trade names: Adequan
- AHFS/Drugs.com: Veterinary Use
- License data: US DailyMed: b0fbf2e7
- Routes of administration: Usually IM or IA
- ATCvet code: none

Legal status
- Legal status: US: ℞-only (by veterinarian)

Pharmacokinetic data
- Protein binding: 30–40%
- Metabolism: Renal
- Onset of action: 48 hours for peak levels in joints (IM)
- Duration of action: 96 hours (IM)
- Excretion: Urine

Identifiers
- UNII: 268AW7000T

Chemical and physical data
- Molar mass: 3,000–15,000 Da

Polysulfated glycosaminoglycan (PSGAG; sold under the brand name Adequan) is an injectable drug for dogs and horses that is used to alleviate the limpness, pain, and lowered range of motion caused by arthritis. It is made of repeat disaccharide units (comprising hexosamine and hexuronic acid), and is similar to glycosaminoglycans already present in the cartilage; PSGAG thus easily integrates itself there. In vitro studies have shown it to inhibit the enzymes that degrade cartilage and bone, as well as suppress inflammation and stimulate the synthesis of replacement cartilage. While it can cause an increased risk of bleeding, it is relatively safe and has a high LD_{50}. PSGAG is one of the most widely prescribed joint treatments for horses.

While it is widely used, some studies still show conflicting results in terms of efficacy, causing some to claim that PSGAG is not solely responsible for the significant mitigation of arthritis seen in success cases.

== Medicinal uses ==
PSGAG is mostly used in dogs and horses for treating traumatic arthritis and degenerative joint disease (osteoarthritis). It has shown to be better at treating acute than chronic arthritis, though some studies say that its effectiveness in acute cases is still limited if degenerative enzymes have not played a role. While it is currently only FDA-approved for dogs and horses, PSGAG is also used off-label to treat lameness in swine, as a chondroprotectant ("joint protector") or treatment of interstitial cystitis in cats, and to treat arthritis in rabbits.

=== Available forms ===
PSGAG is first administered as a series of injections over several weeks, and can be continued once or twice a month thereafter. It is normally injected intramuscularly, though can also be injected intra-articularily (directly into the joint) in horses or subcutaneously in off-label uses. Giving PSGAG intra-articularily requires it to be given aseptically, and is sometimes supplemented by the antibiotic amikacin to prevent infection.

There are no generic or human-labeled equivalents of PSGAG in the US.

== Side effects and overdose ==
Side effects from intra-articular administration can include joint pain, swelling, lameness, and, rarely, infection of the joint. Intramuscular injection can cause dose-dependent inflammation and bleeding, since PSGAG is an analogue of the anticoagulant heparin. In dogs, this may manifest as bleeding from the nose or as bloody stools. The increased risk of bleeding has some advising not to give PSGAG to animals with bleeding disorders, though its only absolute contraindication is hypersensitivity to PSAGs when it is being given intra-articularily.

Overdose on PSGAG is quite rare, as the LD_{50} is over 1000 mg/kg when given intravenously to dogs. Signs of overdose include exacerbated side effects such as joint pain, swelling, and lameness. When dogs received three times the normal dose intramuscularly twice a week for 13 weeks, they had increased liver and kidney weight, as well as microscopic lesions on the liver, kidneys, and lymph nodes. At 11 times the normal dose, they also had increased alanine transferase, cholesterol, and prothrombin time (i.e. coagulation via the extrinsic pathway took longer), and fewer platelets.

== Pharmacology ==
=== Mechanism of action ===
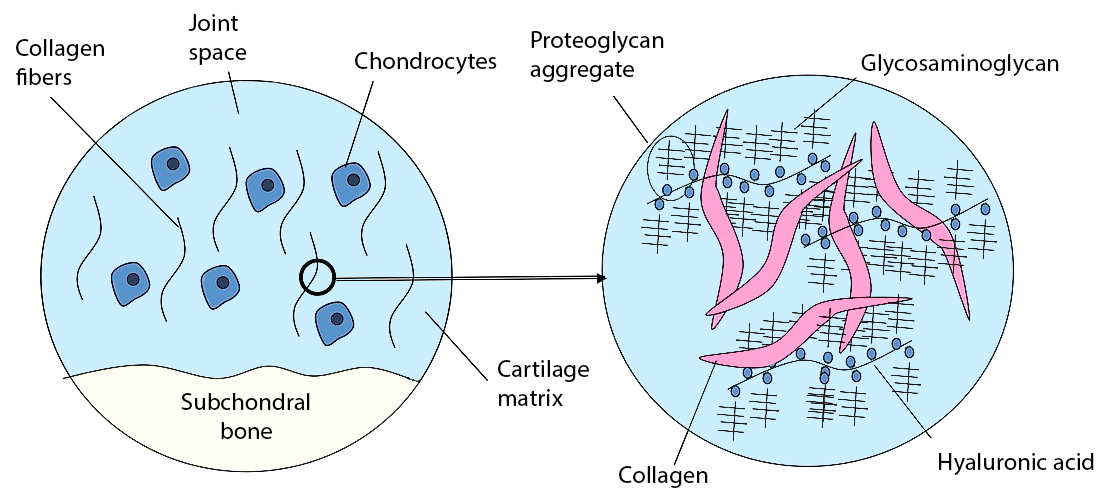
The cartilage matrix. The joint space is filled with synovial fluid. Glycosaminoglycans are attached to proteins, which are attached to a strand of hyaluronic acid to create a "bottle brush".

Normally, joint cartilages have proteoglycan complexes, which are proteins with side chains made of glycosaminoglycans such as keratan sulfate and chondroitin sulfate attached to strands of hyaluronic acid. The glycosaminoglycan side chains are polyanionic, which causes adjacent side chains to push each other away and create a "bottle brush", where hyaluronic acid is the stem and the side chains are the bristles. When pressure is exerted on the joint, fluids move between the chondrocytes and synovial fluid, exchanging nutrients.

In degenerative joint disease, the proteoglycan complexes start disappearing, and the hyaluronate becomes poorer in quality and scarcer. This lowers the viscosity of the synovial fluid (which increases friction) and causes white blood cells and enzymes to enter and effect cartilage degradation and inflammation. Steroids that are released as a result kill the chondrocytes. The remaining chondrocytes have trouble exchanging nutrients with the synovial fluid, which would allow them to repair some damages.

The mechanism of PSGAG in vivo is based on observations and studies in vitro. PSGAG inhibits many of the catabolic enzymes that degrade cartilage, proteoglycans, and hyaluronic acid. The enzymes that are inhibited include serine proteases, which play a role in the IL-1 degradation of proteoglycans and collagen; lysosomal enzymes that cause proteoglycans to dissociate from hyaluronic acid; elastase; metalloproteinases such as stromelysin, which degrade cartilage matrix proteins; collagenases such as cathepsin B1; and hyaluronidase. PSGAG inhibits the synthesis of prostaglandin E2, which is released upon joint injury and causes inflammation, increases the loss of proteoglycan, and reduces the threshold of pain receptors. Inhibiting the complement pathway further reduces inflammation, most likely by altering C-reactive protein. The inhibition of blood coagulation reduces resultant fibrinolysis, which would cause cell death and increase local inflammation.

PSGAG also stimulates the synthesis of glycosaminoglycans, hyaluronic acid, and collagen, which increase synovial viscosity. It cannot, however, completely reverse the disappearance of cartilage, nor can it reverse bone loss caused by arthritis.

=== Pharmacokinetics ===
PSGAG reaches peak blood concentration in 20–40 minutes when injected intramuscularly; 30–40% of it binds to blood proteins. It enters all tissues, reaching cartilage within two hours. When PSGAG reaches the synovial fluid, it is then taken up by the cartilage matrices, with osteoarthritic cartilage showing a stronger preference for taking it up. It reaches its peak levels in the joints at 48 hours, and lasts up to 96 hours, before leaving and being excreted by the kidneys.

== See also ==
- Glucosamine
- NSAIDs
- Osteoarthritis § Management
