= Mycobacterium peregrinum =

Scientific classification
- Domain: Bacteria
- Kingdom: Bacillati
- Phylum: Actinomycetota
- Class: Actinomycetia
- Order: Mycobacteriales
- Family: Mycobacteriaceae
- Genus: Mycobacterium
- Species: M. peregrinum

Binomial name
- Mycobacterium peregrinum (ex Bojalil et al. 1962) Kusunoki and Ezaki 1992

Species of bacterium

Mycobacterium peregrinum is a species of Mycobacterium.
