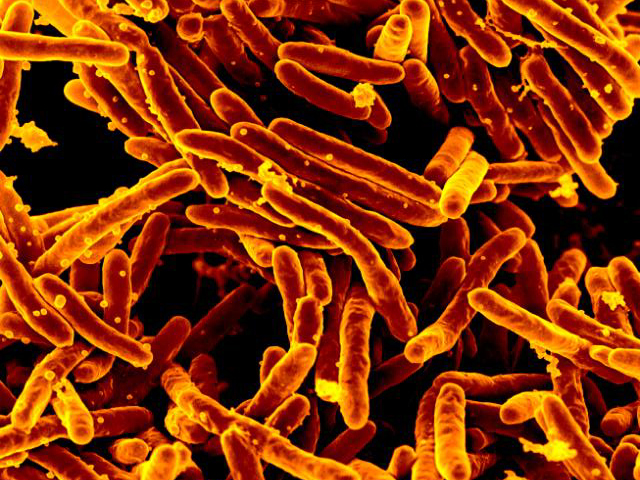
- Mycobacterium tuberculosis

Scientific classification
- Domain: Bacteria
- Kingdom: Bacillati
- Phylum: Actinomycetota
- Class: Actinomycetes
- Order: Mycobacteriales
- Family: Mycobacteriaceae
- Genus: Mycobacteroides
- Species: M. abscessus

Binomial name
- Mycobacteroides abscessus (Moore and Frerichs 1953) Gupta et al. 2018

Type strain
- ATCC 19977; CCUG 20993; CIP 104536; DSM 43491; DSM 44196; Hauduroy L948; JCM 13569; L948; NCTC 13031; TMC 1543

Subspecies
- M. a. subsp. abscessus (Moore and Frerichs 1953) Gupta et al. 2018; M. a. subsp. bolletii (Adékambi et al. 2006) Gupta et al. 2018; M. a. subsp. massiliense (Adékambi et al. 2006) Gupta et al. 2018

Synonyms
- "Mycobacterium abscessus" Moore and Frerichs 1953; Mycobacterium abscessus (Moore and Frerichs 1953) Kusunoki and Ezaki 1992; Mycobacterium bolletii Adékambi et al. 2006; Mycobacterium chelonae subsp. abscessus corrig. (Moore and Frerichs 1953) Kubica et al. 1972 (Approved Lists 1980); Mycobacterium chelonei subsp. abscessus (Moore and Frerichs 1953) Kubica et al. 1972 (Approved Lists 1980); Mycobacterium massiliense Adékambi et al. 2006

= Mycobacteroides abscessus =

Species of bacterium

Mycobacteroides abscessus (formerly Mycobacterium abscessus) is a species of rapidly growing, multidrug-resistant, nontuberculous mycobacteria (NTM) that is a common soil and water contaminant. Although M. abscessus most commonly causes chronic lung infection and skin and soft tissue infection (SSTI), it can also cause infection in almost all human organs, mostly in patients with suppressed immune systems. Amongst NTM species responsible for disease, infection caused by M. abscessus complex are more difficult to treat due to antimicrobial drug resistance.

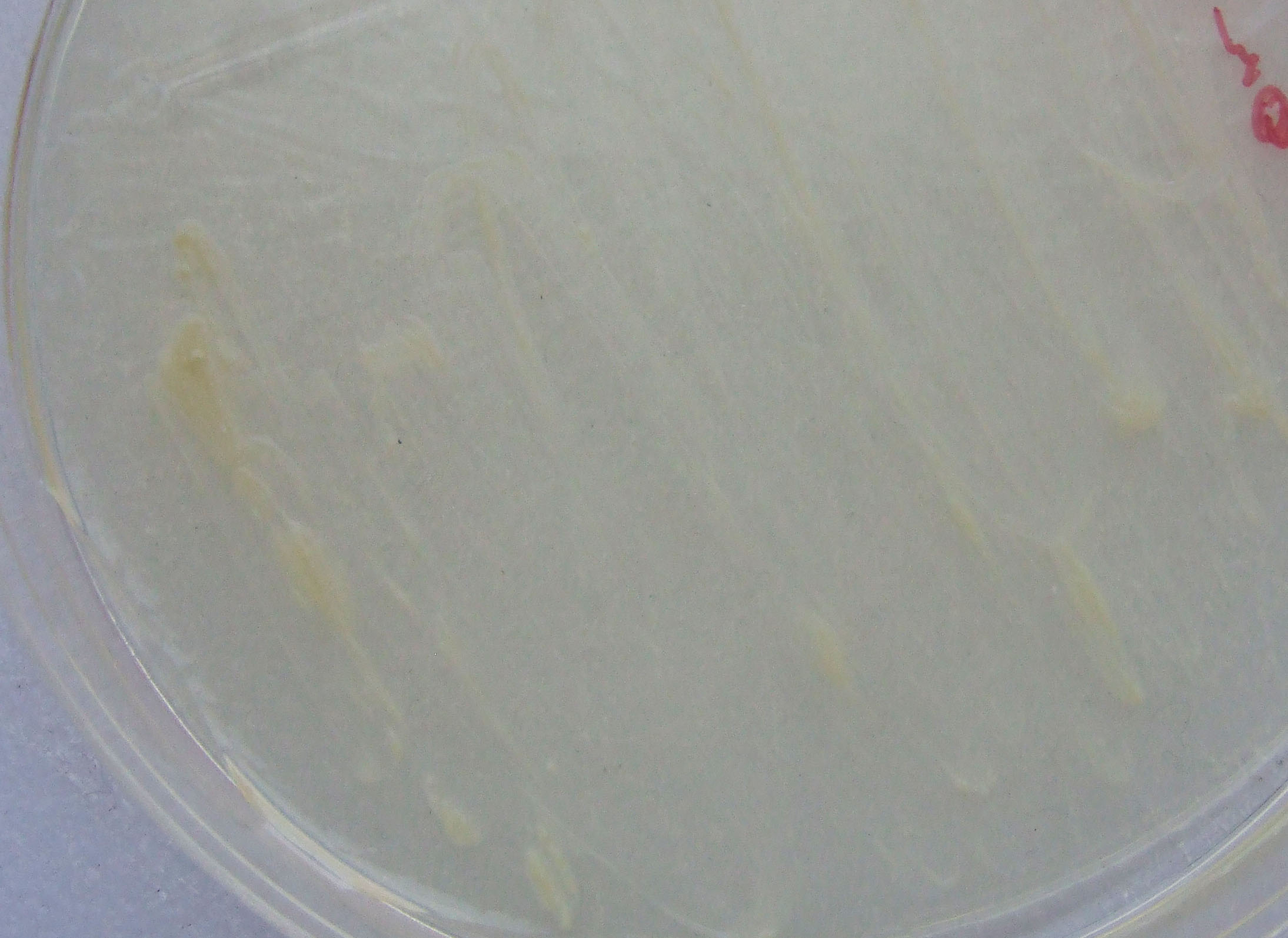
M. abscessus grown in starch-based medium on a Petri dish: Colonies appear as light yellow streaks.

== Description ==
Mycobacteroides abscessus cells are Gram-positive, nonmotile, acid-fast rods about 1.0–2.5 μm long by 0.5 μm wide. They may form colonies on Löwenstein–Jensen medium that appear smooth or rough, white or greyish, and nonphotochromogenic.

=== Etymology ===
Abscessus is named for abscesses. It is a Latin word derived from ab- ("away") + cedere ("to go") because it was the ancient medical notion that a manifestation of the four humors was for pus to leave the body. M. abscessus was first isolated from gluteal abscesses in a 62-year-old patient who had injured her knee as a child and had a disseminated infection 48 years later. The species M. bolletii, which was first described in 2006, is named after the late eminent French microbiologist and taxonomist Claude Bollet.

== Physiology ==
M. abscessus shows growth at 28 °C and 37 °C after 7 days, but not at 43 °C. It may grow on MacConkey agar at 28 °C and even 37 °C. It shows tolerance to saline media (5% NaCl) and 500 mg/L hydroxylamine (Ogawa egg medium) and 0.2% picrate (Sauton agar medium). Strains of the species have been shown to degrade the antibiotic p-aminosalicylate. M. abscessus has also been shown to produce arylsulfatase, but not of nitrate reductase and Tween 80 hydrolase. It shows a negative result for the iron uptake test and no use of fructose, glucose, oxalate, or citrate as sole carbon sources.

== Differential characteristics ==
M. abscessus and M. chelonae can be distinguished from M. fortuitum or M. peregrinum by their failure to reduce nitrate and to take up iron. Tolerance to 5% NaCl in Löwenstein-Jensen medium, tolerance to 0.2% picrate in Sauton agar, and non-use of citrate as a sole carbon source are characteristics that distinguish M. abscessus from M. chelonae. M. abscessus and M. chelonae sequevar I share an identical sequence in the 54-510 region of 16S rRNA, though both species can be differentiated by their hsp65, ITS or rpoB gene sequences.

== Genetics ==
A draft genome sequence of M. abscessus subsp. bolletii BD^{T} was completed in 2012. Since then, a large number of strains from this subspecies have had their genomes sequenced, leading to a clarification of subspecies boundaries. In 1992, M. abscessus was first recognised as a distinct species. In 2006, this group was separated into three subspecies: M. a. abscessus, M. a. bolletii, and M. a. massiliense. In 2011, the latter two were briefly merged into a single subspecies, but were subsequently separated again following greater availability of genome sequence data, which showed the three subspecies formed genetically distinct groups. It has been proposed that M. bolletii and M. massiliense be reinstated as unique species.

These distinct groups also correspond to important biological differences. Clinically important differences include differing susceptibilities to antibiotics. M. a. abscessus and M. a. bolletii carry a common antibiotic resistance gene, which confers resistance to macrolide antibiotics, while M. a. massiliense is thought to carry a nonfunctional copy, so is more susceptible to antibiotics and more easily treated.

== Pathogenesis ==
M. abscessus can cause lung disease, skin infections, central nervous system infections, bacteremia, eye infections, and other, less common diseases.

Chronic lung disease occurs most commonly in vulnerable hosts with underlying lung disease such as cystic fibrosis, bronchiectasis, and prior tuberculosis. Clinical symptoms of lung infection vary in scope and intensity, but commonly include chronic cough, often with purulent sputum. Haemoptysis may also be present. Systemic symptoms include malaise, fatigue, and weight loss in advanced disease. The diagnosis of M. abscessus pulmonary infection requires the presence of symptoms, radiologic abnormalities, and microbiologic cultures.

M. abscessus can cause skin infections in immunodeficient patients, patients who have recently undergone surgery, tattooing, or acupuncture, or after exposure to hot springs or spas. It can be associated with middle-ear infections (otitis media).

The incidence of M. abscessus infections appears to be increasing over time. Outbreaks of M. abscessus have been reported in hospitals and clinical settings worldwide. While outbreaks of major clinical concern involve transmission (most likely indirect transmission) between vulnerable patients such as those receiving lung transplants or being treated for cystic fibrosis, outbreaks have also been reported at clinics providing cosmetic surgery, liposuction, mesotherapy and IV infusion of cell therapy, although these are more attributable to contaminated disinfectants, saline and instruments than contact between patients.

== Management ==
=== Bacteriophage therapy ===
A study from 2019 supported the capability of phages in killing resistant bacteria unable to be treated with antibiotics. Research laboratories came together to find these phages by collecting, isolating, and exposing them to resistant M. abscessus that had been isolated from a patient in London.

==== In vitro ====
A bacteriophage known as Muddy had proved effective at killing the patient's distinct M. abscessus strain (GD01), while phages like ZoeJ and BPs had reduced capabilities at infecting GD01. A mixture of phages, Muddy and engineered versions of ZoeJ and BPs, though, completely infected and killed GD01.

==== In vivo ====
A cocktail of bacteriophages, Muddy, ZoeJ, and BPs, effectively killed a strain of M. abscessus in vitro. The potential this showed encouraged the commencement of patient treatments towards the GD01 infection. Every 12 hours, the patient received a treatment of the bacteriophage cocktail.

One day of treatment showed high bacteriophage levels in the bloodstream. This suggested that they were being released into the bloodstream and replicating to infect bacteria. No significant side effects were reported. The right phages were found for this patient, but a different strain may be sensitive to different phages.

== Type strain ==
The type strain of M. abscessus, most commonly referred to as ATCC 19977, was isolated in 1953 from a human knee infection presenting with abscess-like lesions, leading to the strain being named "abscessus". The strain wasn't recognised as a distinct species until 1992, however, when DNA hybridisation work identified it as genetically distinct from its relative, M. chelonae. The genome of the type train was published in 2009.
