= Nicotinate-nucleotide adenylyltransferase =

Class of enzyme

Identifiers
- EC no.: 2.7.7.18
- CAS no.: 9026-98-6

Databases
- IntEnz: IntEnz view
- BRENDA: BRENDA entry
- ExPASy: NiceZyme view
- KEGG: KEGG entry
- MetaCyc: metabolic pathway
- PRIAM: profile
- PDB structures: RCSB PDB PDBe PDBsum
- Gene Ontology: AmiGO / QuickGO
Search
- PMC: articles
- PubMed: articles
- NCBI: proteins

Nicotinate-nucleotide adenylyltransferase (EC 2.7.7.18) is an enzyme that catalyzes the chemical reaction

adenosine triphosphate
+
nicotinate mononucleotide
PP_{i}
deamido-NAD

The enzyme characterised from Escherichia coli combines adenosine triphosphate and nicotinate mononucleotide to give deamido-NAD, a precursor to the coenzyme, nicotinamide adenine dinucleotide (NAD). Pyrophosphate (PP_{i}) is a byproduct. In organisms which use this biosynthetic pathway to NAD, the final step is an amidation reaction.

This enzyme belongs to the family of transferases, specifically those transferring phosphorus-containing nucleotide groups (nucleotidyltransferases). The systematic name of this enzyme class is ATP:nicotinate-ribonucleotide adenylyltransferase. Other names in common use include deamido-NAD+ pyrophosphorylase, nicotinate mononucleotide adenylyltransferase, deamidonicotinamide adenine dinucleotide pyrophosphorylase, NaMN-ATase, and nicotinic acid mononucleotide adenylyltransferase.

== Structural studies ==
As of late 2007, 9 structures have been solved for this class of enzymes, with PDB accession codes PDB: 1K4K, PDB: 1K4M, PDB: 1KAM, PDB: 1KAQ, PDB: 1YUL, PDB: 1YUM, PDB: 1YUN, PDB: 2H29, and PDB: 2H2A.
