= Kanamycin A =

Antibiotic

Clinical data
- Other names: K/KAN/HLK/KM
- AHFS/Drugs.com: Monograph
- Pregnancy category: D
- Routes of administration: By mouth, intravenous, intramuscular
- ATC code: A07AA08 (WHO) J01GB04 (WHO) S01AA24 (WHO)

Pharmacokinetic data
- Bioavailability: very low after by mouth delivery
- Metabolism: Unknown
- Elimination half-life: 2 hours 30 minutes
- Excretion: Urine (as unchanged drug)

Identifiers
- IUPAC name: 2-(aminomethyl)- 6-[4,6-diamino-3- [4-amino-3,5-dihydroxy-6-(hydroxymethyl) tetrahydropyran-2-yl]oxy- 2-hydroxy- cyclohexoxy]- tetrahydropyran- 3,4,5-triol
- CAS Number: 59-01-8; 8063-07-8
- PubChem CID: 6032
- DrugBank: DB01172
- ChemSpider: 5810
- UNII: EQK9Q303C5; RUC37XUP2P
- ChEBI: CHEBI:17630
- ChEMBL: ChEMBL1384
- PDB ligand: KAN (PDBe, RCSB PDB)
- CompTox Dashboard (EPA): DTXSID3023184
- ECHA InfoCard: 100.000.374

Chemical and physical data
- Formula: C_{18}H_{36}N_{4}O_{11}
- Molar mass: 484.503 g·mol^{−1}
- 3D model (JSmol): Interactive image
- SMILES: O([C@@H]2[C@@H](O)[C@H](O[C@H]1O[C@H](CN)[C@@H](O)[C@H](O)[C@H]1O)[C@@H](N)C[C@H]2N)[C@H]3O[C@@H]([C@@H](O)[C@H](N)[C@H]3O)CO
- InChI: InChI=1S/C18H36N4O11/c19-2-6-10(25)12(27)13(28)18(30-6)33-16-5(21)1-4(20)15(14(16)29)32-17-11(26)8(22)9(24)7(3-23)31-17/h4-18,23-29H,1-3,19-22H2/t4-,5+,6-,7-,8+,9-,10-,11-,12+,13-,14-,15+,16-,17-,18-/m1/s1; Key:SBUJHOSQTJFQJX-NOAMYHISSA-N

Kanamycin A, often referred to simply as kanamycin, is an antibiotic used to treat severe bacterial infections and tuberculosis. It is not a first line treatment. It is used by mouth, injection into a vein, or injection into a muscle. Kanamycin is recommended for short-term use only, usually from 7 to 10 days. Since antibiotics only show activity against bacteria, it is ineffective in viral infections.

Common side effects include hearing and balance problems. Kidney problems may also occur. Kanamycin is not recommended during pregnancy as it may harm the fetus. It is likely safe during breastfeeding. Kanamycin is in the aminoglycoside family of medications. It has the weakest antibacterial capabilities of all compounds in this family when used clinically, which is partially due to its increased toxicity in comparison to other aminoglycosides. It works by blocking the production of proteins that are required for bacterial survival.

Kanamycin was first isolated in 1957 by Hamao Umezawa from the bacterium Streptomyces kanamyceticus. It was removed from the World Health Organization's List of Essential Medicines in 2019. It is no longer marketed in the United States.

== Medical uses ==
=== Spectrum of activity ===
Kanamycin is indicated for short-term treatment of bacterial infections caused by one or more of the following pathogens: E. coli, Proteus species (both indole-positive and indole-negative), Enterobacter aerogenes, Klebsiella pneumoniae, Serratia marcescens, and Acinetobacter species. In cases of serious infection when the causative organism is unknown, Kanamycin injection in conjunction with a penicillin- or cephalosporin-type drug may be given initially before obtaining results of susceptibility testing.

Kanamycin does not treat viral infections.

=== Pregnancy and breastfeeding ===
Kanamycin is pregnancy category D in the United States.

Kanamycin enters breast milk in small amounts. The manufacturer therefore advises that people should either stop breastfeeding or kanamycin. The American Academy of Pediatrics considers kanamycin okay in breastfeeding.

=== Children ===
Kanamycin should be used with caution in newborns due to the risk of increased drug concentration resulting from immature kidney function.

== Side effects ==
Serious side effects include ringing in the ears or loss of hearing, toxicity to kidneys, and allergic reactions to the drug. Ototoxicity is a common quality among aminoglycosides, and its rate of incidence in kanamycin is around 3-10%.

Other side effects include:

Gastrointestinal effects

- Nausea, vomiting, diarrhea

Musculoskeletal effects

- Myasthenia gravis

Neurologic effects

- Headache
- Paresthesias
- Blurring of vision
- Neuromuscular blockade

Metabolic effects

- Malabsorption syndrome

== Pharmacology ==
=== Mechanism of action ===
Kanamycin is bactericidal and works by interfering with protein synthesis. It binds to the 30S subunit of the bacterial ribosome. This results in incorrect alignment with the mRNA and eventually leads to a misread that causes the wrong amino acid to be placed into the peptide. This leads to nonfunctional peptide chains, eventually killing the bacteria.

=== Bacterial resistance ===
Bacterial resistance to kanamycin is a serious and increasing phenomenon, which is very concerning for its use in treating multidrug-resistant tuberculosis and other multidrug-resistant Gram-negative bacterial infections. This is due in part to possible cross-resistance between kanamycin and other aminoglycosides, such as amikacin, capreomycin, and gentamicin. Natural resistance to these aminoglycosides is usually due to mutations in the 16S rRNA gene (rrs) within the 30S subunit that impairs the antibacterial from binding tightly to the ribosomal RNA. These mutations are most commonly identified through a single-nucleotide variant at the position 1401.

A commonly used kanamycin resistance gene used in bacterial plasmids is KanR which encodes an aminoglycoside phosphotransferase (also called kanamycin kinase). It inactivates kanamycin by catalyzing the transfer of phosphate (from ATP) to kanamycin, so it cannot bind to the bacterial ribosome anymore.

== Chemistry ==
=== Composition ===
Kanamycin is a mixture of three main components: kanamycin A, B, and C. Kanamycin A is the major component in kanamycin. The effects of these components do not appear to be widely studied as individual compounds when used against prokaryotic and eukaryotic cells. The IUPAC name of Kanamycin A is O-3-amino-3-deoxy-α-D-glucopyranosyl-(1→6)-O-[6-deoxy-6-amino-α-D-glucopyranosyl-(1→4)]-2-deoxy-D-streptamine.

=== Biosynthesis ===
While the main product produced by Streptomyces kanamyceticus is kanamycin A, additional products are also produced, including kanamycin B, kanamycin C, kanamycin D and kanamycin X.

The kanamycin biosynthetic pathway can be divided into two parts. The first part is common to several aminoglycoside antibiotics, such as butirosin and neomycin. In it a unique aminocyclitol, 2-deoxystreptamine, is biosynthesized from D-glucopyranose 6-phosphate in four steps. At this point the kanamycin pathway splits into two branches due to the promiscuity of the next enzyme, which can utilize two different glycosyl donors - UDP-N-acetyl-α-D-glucosamine and UDP-α-D-glucose. One of the branches forms kanamycin C and kanamycin B, while the other branch forms kanamycin D and kanamycin X. However, both kanamycin B and kanamycin D can be converted to kanamycin A, so both branches of the pathway converge at kanamycin A.

== Use in research ==
Kanamycin is used in molecular biology as a selective agent most commonly to isolate bacteria (e.g., E. coli) which have taken up genes (e.g., of plasmids) coupled to a gene coding for kanamycin resistance (primarily Neomycin phosphotransferase II [NPT II/Neo]). Bacteria that have been transformed with a plasmid containing the kanamycin resistance gene are plated on kanamycin (50-100 μg/mL) containing agar plates or are grown in media containing kanamycin (50-100 μg/mL). Only the bacteria that have successfully taken up the kanamycin resistance gene become resistant and will grow under these conditions. As a powder, kanamycin is white to off-white and is soluble in water (50 mg/mL).

=== KanMX marker ===
The selection marker kanMX is a hybrid gene consisting of a bacterial aminoglycoside phosphotransferase (kan^{r} from transposon Tn903) under control of the strong TEF promoter from Ashbya gossypii.

Mammalian cells, yeast, and other eukaryotes acquire resistance to geneticin (= G418, an aminoglycoside antibiotic similar to kanamycin) when transformed with a kanMX marker. In yeast, the kanMX marker avoids the requirement of auxotrophic markers. In addition, the kanMX marker renders E. coli resistant to kanamycin. In shuttle vectors the KanMX cassette is used with an additional bacterial promoter. Several versions of the kanMX cassette are in use, e.g. kanMX1-kanMX6. They primarily differ by additional restriction sites and other small changes around the actual open reading frame.

== Antibiotic conjugated nanoparticle synthesis ==
Antibiotic resistance or development of multi-drug resistant bacterial strains is a key challenge for treating bacterial infections. With limited research being carried out to design and develop new antibiotics, novel approaches like functionalizing antibiotic to metal nanoparticles surface to treat resistant bacterial strains have been studied. Kanamycin functionalized gold-nanoparticles (Kan-GNPs) were synthesized and tested for its antibacterial activity against both gram positive and gram negative strains. A dose dependent antibacterial activity was noted for Kan-GNPs in comparison to free kanamycin.
