= Multidrug-resistant tuberculosis =

Multidrug-resistance tuberculosis
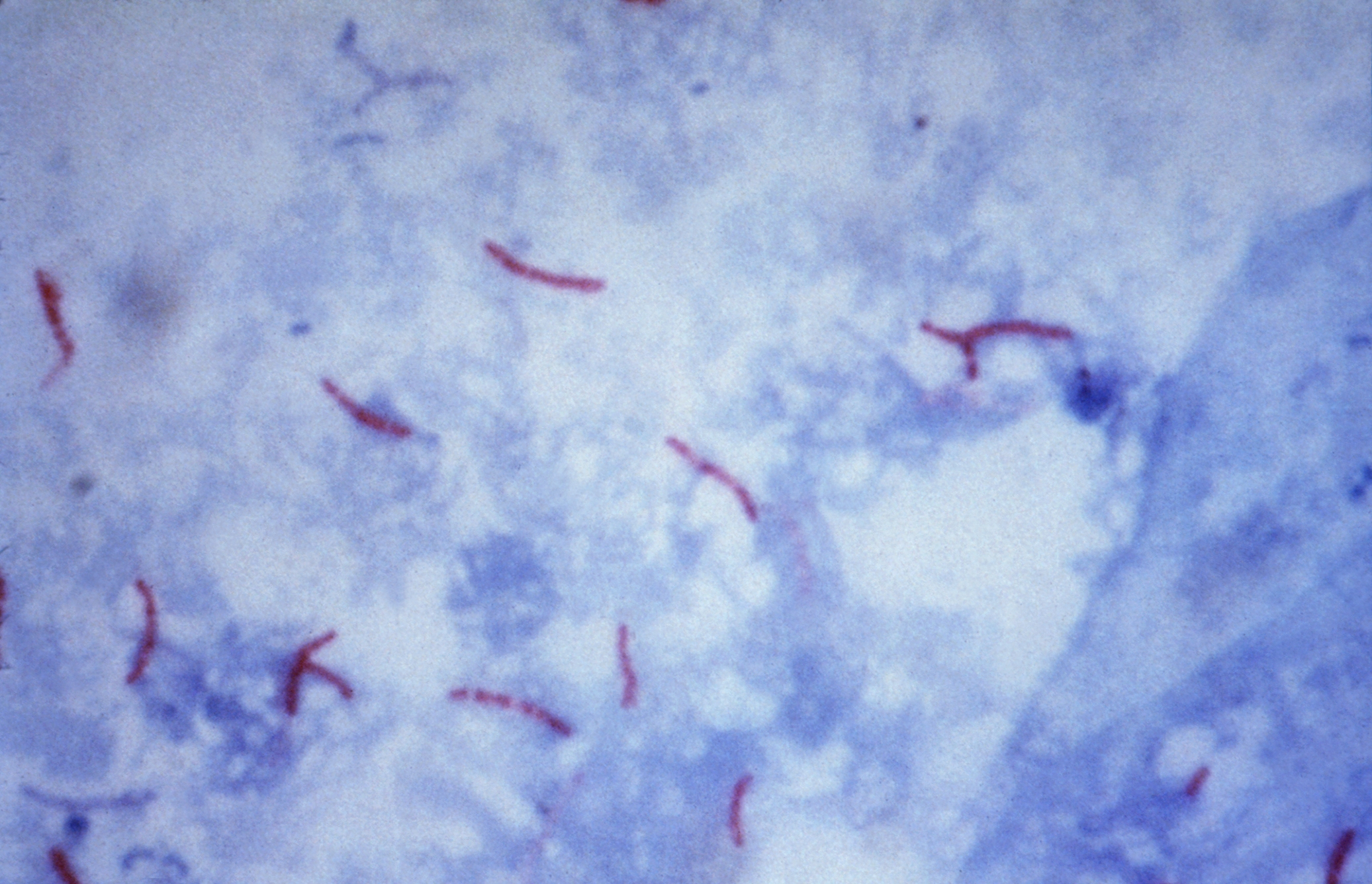
- Mycobacterium tuberculosis bacteria seen by microscope
- Specialty: Infectious disease

Multidrug-resistant tuberculosis (MDR-TB) is a form of tuberculosis (TB) infection caused by bacteria that are resistant to treatment with at least two of the most powerful first-line anti-TB medications (drugs): isoniazid and rifampicin. Some forms of TB are also resistant to second-line medications, and are called extensively drug-resistant TB (XDR-TB).

Tuberculosis is caused by infection with the bacterium Mycobacterium tuberculosis. Almost one in four people in the world are infected with TB bacteria. Only when the bacteria become active do people become ill with TB. Bacteria become active as a result of anything that can reduce the person's immunity, such as HIV, advancing age, diabetes or other immunocompromising illnesses. TB can usually be treated with a course of four standard, or first-line, anti-TB drugs (i.e., isoniazid, rifampicin, pyrazinamide and ethambutol).

However, beginning with the first antibiotic treatment for TB in 1943, some strains of the TB bacteria developed resistance to the standard drugs through genetic changes (see mechanisms). This process accelerates if incorrect or inadequate treatments are used, leading to the development and spread of multidrug-resistant TB (MDR-TB). Incorrect or inadequate treatment may be due to use of the wrong medications, use of only one medication (standard treatment is at least two drugs), or not taking medication consistently or for the full treatment period (treatment is required for several months).

Treatment of MDR-TB requires treatment with second-line drugs, (i.e., fluoroquinolones, aminoglycosides, and others), which in general are less effective, more toxic and much more expensive than first-line drugs. Treatment regimes can run for two years, compared to the six months of first-line drug treatment. If these second-line drugs are prescribed or taken incorrectly, further resistance can develop leading to XDR-TB.

MDR-TB can be directly transmitted from an infected person to an uninfected person. In this case a previously untreated person develops a new case of MDR-TB. This is known as primary MDR-TB, and is responsible for up to 75% of cases. Acquired MDR-TB develops when a person with a non-resistant strain of TB is treated inadequately, resulting in the development of antibiotic resistance in the TB bacteria infecting them. These people can in turn infect other people with MDR-TB.

MDR-TB caused an estimated 600,000 new TB cases and 240,000 deaths in 2016 and MDR-TB accounts for 4.1% of all new TB cases and 19% of previously treated cases worldwide. Globally, most MDR-TB cases occur in South America, Southern Africa, India, China, and the former Soviet Union.

== Origin ==
Researchers hypothesize that an ancestor of Mycobacterium tuberculosis first originated in the East African region approximately 3 million years ago, with modern strains mutating and arising 20,000 years ago. As migration out of East Africa increased, so did the spread of the disease, starting in Asia and then spreading towards the West and South America. Multidrug-resistant tuberculosis has a variety of causes, but resistance is usually due to treatment failure, drug combinations, coinfections, prior use of anti-TB medications, inadequate absorption of medication, underlying disease, and noncompliance with anti-TB drugs.

== Mechanism of drug resistance ==
The TB bacterium has natural defenses against some drugs, and can acquire drug resistance through genetic mutations. The bacterium does not have the ability to transfer genes for resistance between organisms through plasmids (see horizontal transfer). Some mechanisms of drug resistance include:

1. Cell wall: The cell wall of M. tuberculosis (TB) contains complex lipid molecules which act as a barrier to stop drugs from entering the cell. In order to lessen its vulnerability, M. tuberculosis can also stop medications from penetrating its cells. RIF resistance is linked to numerous genes and proteins that are involved in the formation of cell walls. Maintaining the M. tuberculosis cell wall is a major function of the PE11 protein. It is hypothesized that upregulating the production of PE11 protein can decrease the quantity of antibiotics that enter M. tuberculosis. The expression of M. tuberculosis PE11 protein in M. smegmatis can generate raised resistance levels to several antibiotics, including RIF.
2. Drug modifying & inactivating enzymes: The TB genome codes for enzymes (proteins) that inactivate drug molecules. These enzymes are usually phosphorylate, acetylate, or adenylate drug compounds.
3. Drug efflux systems: The TB cell contains molecular systems that actively pump drug molecules out of the cell.
4. Mutations: Spontaneous mutations in the TB genome can alter proteins which are the target of drugs, making the bacteria drug-resistant.

One example is a mutation in the rpoB gene, which encodes the beta subunit of the bacterium's RNA polymerase enzyme. In non-resistant TB, rifampin binds the beta subunit of RNA polymerase and disrupts transcription elongation. Mutation in the rpoB gene changes the sequence of amino acids and eventual conformation, or arrangement, of the beta subunit. In this case, rifampin can no longer bind or prevent transcription, and the bacterium is resistant.

Other mutations make the bacterium resistant to other drugs. For example, there are many mutations that confer resistance to isoniazid (INH), including in the genes katG, inhA, ahpC and others. Amino acid replacements in the NADH binding site of InhA apparently result in INH resistance by preventing the inhibition of mycolic acid biosynthesis, which the bacterium uses in its cell wall. Mutations in the katG gene make the enzyme catalase peroxidase unable to convert INH to its biologically active form. Hence, INH is ineffective and the bacterium is resistant. The discovery of new molecular targets is essential to overcome drug-resistance problems.

In some TB bacteria, the acquisition of these mutations can be explained by other mutations in the DNA recombination, recognition and repair machinery. Mutations in these genes allow the bacteria to have a higher overall mutation rate and to accumulate mutations that cause drug resistance more quickly.

== Extensively drug-resistant TB ==
MDR-TB can become resistant to the major second-line TB drug groups: fluoroquinolones (moxifloxacin, ofloxacin), bedaquiline, linezolid, and injectable aminoglycosides (amikacin, streptomycin). When MDR-TB is resistant to at least two of these, it is classified as extensively drug-resistant tuberculosis (XDR-TB).

WHO has revised the definitions of pre-XDR-TB and XDR-TB in 2021 as following:

Pre-XDR-TB: TB caused by Mycobacterium tuberculosis (M. tuberculosis) strains that fulfill the definition of MDR/RR-TB and which are also resistant to any fluoroquinolone.

XDR-TB: TB caused by Mycobacterium tuberculosis (M. tuberculosis) strains that fulfill the definition of MDR/RR-TB and which are also resistant to any fluoroquinolone and at least one additional Group A drug.

The Group A drugs are currently levofloxacin or moxifloxacin, bedaquiline and linezolid, therefore XDR-TB is MDR/RR-TB that is resistant to a fluoroquinolone and at least one of bedaquiline or linezolid (or both).

In a study of MDR-TB patients from 2005 to 2008 in various countries, 43.7% had resistance to at least one second-line drug. About 9% of MDR-TB cases are resistant to a drug from both classes and classified as XDR-TB.

In the 2010s, hospitals in Italy, Iran, India, and South Africa reported TB strains which were resistant to all available first and second line TB drugs, called totally drug-resistant tuberculosis, though there is some controversy over this term. The WHO does not use the term “totally drug-resistant tuberculosis” due to the poor reliability of susceptibility tests for some drugs. Increasing levels of resistance in TB strains threaten to complicate the current global public health approaches to TB control. New drugs are being developed to treat extensively resistant forms but major improvements in detection, diagnosis, and treatment will be needed.

== Prevention ==
There are several ways that drug resistance to TB, and drug resistance in general, can be prevented:

1. Rapid diagnosis & treatment of TB: One of the greatest risk factors for drug-resistant TB is problems in treatment and diagnosis, especially in developing countries. If TB is identified and treated soon, drug resistance can be avoided.
2. Completion of treatment: Previous treatment of TB is an indicator of MDR TB. If the patient does not complete their antibiotic treatment, or if the physician does not prescribe the proper antibiotic regimen, resistance can develop. Also, drugs that are of poor quality or less in quantity, especially in developing countries, contribute to MDR TB.
3. Identifying and diagnosing patients with HIV/AIDS as soon as possible. They lack the immunity to fight the TB infection and are at great risk of developing drug resistance.
4. Identifying contacts who could have contracted TB: family members, people in close contact, etc.
5. Research: Much research and funding is needed in the diagnosis, prevention and treatment of TB and MDR TB.

"Opponents of a universal tuberculosis treatment, reasoning from misguided notions of cost-effectiveness, fail to acknowledge that MDRTB is not a disease of poor people in distant places. The disease is infectious and airborne. Treating only one group of patients looks inexpensive in the short run, but will prove disastrous for all in the long run." Paul Farmer

=== DOTS-Plus ===
Community-based treatment programs such as DOTS-Plus, a MDR-TB-specialized treatment using the popular Directly Observed Therapy – Short Course (DOTS) initiative, have shown considerable success in the world. In these locales, these programs have proven to be a good option for proper treatment of MDR-TB in poor, rural areas. A successful example has been in Lima, Peru, where the program has seen cure rates of over 80%.

However, the DOTS program administered in the Republic of Georgia uses passive case finding. This means that the system depends on patients coming to health care providers, without conducting compulsory screenings. As medical anthropologists like Erin Koch have shown, this form of implementation does not suit all cultural structures. They urge that the DOTS protocol be constantly reformed in the context of local practices, forms of knowledge and everyday life.

== Treatment ==
Usually, multidrug-resistant tuberculosis can be cured with long treatments of second-line drugs, but these are more expensive than first-line drugs and have more adverse effects. Additionally, treatment regimens can be quite long and have higher failure rates than the regimen for non-resistant TB. MDR-TB has a mortality rate of about 15% with treatment, which further depends on a number of factors, including:

1. How many drugs the organism is resistant to (the fewer the better)
2. How many drugs the patient is given
3. The expertise and experience of the physician responsible
4. How co-operative the patient is with treatment
5. Whether the patient is HIV-positive or not (HIV co-infection is associated with increased mortality).

The treatment of MDR-TB must be undertaken by physicians experienced in the treatment of MDR-TB. Mortality and morbidity in patients treated in non-specialist centers are significantly higher than those of patients treated in specialist centers. Patients with suspected MDR-TB should always have susceptibility testing; however, treatment can be started while laboratory results are pending. Patients who have previously been treated with a second-line medication for more than 1 month are likely to be resistant to it. Hence, the patient's treatment history should be acquired if possible.

For rifampicin-resistant TB, WHO guidelines recommend prescribing an oral fluoroquinolone (such as moxifloxacin), linezolid, bedaquiline, and either clofazimine or cycloserine for 18 months. If one of the first three is contraindicated or unavailable, both clofazimine and cycloserine (or its derivative terizidone) are used. Ethambutol, pyrazinamide, high-dose isoniazid, or ethionamide may be added to allow for a shorter treatment length. Other TB drugs- delamanid, imipanem, meropenem, amikacin, or streptomycin- cannot be given orally and/or have severe side effects, so their use is typically limited to patients that cannot appropriately be treated with other medications or in case of treatment failure.

An alternative regimen for patients with MDR-TB (except for certain severe forms of extrapulmonary TB) susceptible to second-line drugs is BPaLM: bedaquiline, pretomanid, linezolid, and moxifloxacin. This is often taken for 6 months, as opposed to the 9 to 18 months required for other regimens. However, pretomanid has not been studied in pregnant or breastfeeding women or children under 14, so they are ineligible.

A gene probe for rpoB is available in some countries. This serves as a useful marker for MDR-TB, because isolated RMP resistance is rare (except when patients have a history of being treated with rifampicin alone). If the results of a gene probe (rpoB) are known to be positive, then it is reasonable to assume the patient has MDR-TB and treat accordingly.

In general, resistance to one drug within a class means resistance to all drugs within that class, but a notable exception is rifabutin: Rifampin-resistance does not always mean rifabutin-resistance, and the laboratory should be asked to test for it. It is possible to use only one drug within each drug class. While Rifampin is an effective drug, lack of adherence has led to relapse. This is why the use of various first-line drugs, along with developing new drugs that are specific towards drug-resistant strains, is essential. Directly observed therapy helps to improve outcomes in MDR-TB and should be considered an integral part of the treatment of MDR-TB.

Patients with MDR-TB should be isolated in negative-pressure rooms, if possible. Patients with MDR-TB should not be accommodated on the same ward as immunosuppressed patients (HIV-infected patients, or patients on immunosuppressive drugs). Careful monitoring of compliance with treatment is crucial to the management of MDR-TB (and some physicians insist on hospitalization if only for this reason). Some physicians will insist that these patients remain isolated until their sputum is smear-negative, or even culture-negative (which may take many months, or even years). Keeping these patients in hospital for weeks (or months) on end may be a practical or physical impossibility, and the final decision depends on the clinical judgement of the physician treating that patient. The attending physician should make full use of therapeutic drug monitoring (in particular, of the aminoglycosides) both to monitor compliance and to avoid toxic effects. Response to treatment must be obtained by repeated sputum cultures (monthly if possible).

Some supplements may be useful as adjuncts in the treatment of tuberculosis, but, for the purposes of counting drugs for MDR-TB, they count as zero. Patients on ethionamide should take vitamin B6 to avoid neurotoxicity. Other supplements include: arginine,vitamin D,^{[needs update]} Dzherelo, and V5 Immunitor.

=== Access and efficacy ===
The majority of patients with multidrug-resistant tuberculosis do not receive treatment, as they are found in underdeveloped countries or in poverty. Denial of treatment remains a difficult human rights issue, as the high cost of second-line medications often precludes those who cannot afford therapy.

A study of cost-effective strategies for tuberculosis control supported three major policies. First, the treatment of microscopically confirmed pulmonary TB cases in accordance with international standards should be a basic practice for all control programs. Second, it is recommended to treat pulmonary cases without microscopic confirmation and extra-pulmonary cases as part of WHO's "STOP TB" approach and the second global plan for tuberculosis control. Last but not least, the study shows that a significant scaling-up of all interventions is needed in the next 10 years if the millennium development goal and related goals for tuberculosis control are to be achieved. If the case detection rate can be improved, this will guarantee that people who gain access to treatment facilities are covered and that coverage is widely distributed to people who do not now have access.^{[needs update]}

The resurgence of tuberculosis in the United States, the advent of HIV-related tuberculosis, and the development of strains of TB resistant to the first-line therapies developed in recent decades serve to reinforce the thesis that Mycobacterium tuberculosis, the causative organism, makes its own preferential option for the poor. The simple truth is that almost all tuberculosis deaths result from a lack of access to existing effective therapy.

Treatment success rates remain unacceptably low globally, with variation between regions. 2016 data published by the WHO reported treatment success rates of multidrug-resistant TB globally. For those started on treatment for multidrug-resistant TB 56% successfully completed treatment, either treatment course completion or eradication of disease; 15% of those died while in treatment; 15% were lost to follow-up; 8% had treatment failure and there was no data on the remaining 6%. Treatment success rate was highest in the World Health Organization Mediterranean region at 65%. Treatment success rates were lower than 50% in Ukraine, Mozambique, Indonesia and India. Areas with poor TB surveillance infrastructure had higher rates of loss to follow-up of treatment.

57 countries reported outcomes for patients started on extreme-drug resistant TB, this included 9,258 patients. 39% completed treatment successfully, 26% of patients died and treatment failed for 18%. 84% of the extreme drug resistant cohort was made up of only three countries; India, Russian Federation and Ukraine. Shorter treatment regimes for MDR-TB have been found to be beneficial having higher treatment success rates.

=== Surgery ===
In cases of extremely resistant disease, surgery to remove infection portions of the lung is, in general, the final option. Early surgical treatments beginning in the 19th century include inducing lung collapse, as standing tissue heals faster than tissue in use, called artificial pneumothorax. Shrinking the lung cavity, thoracoplasty, to fill void space caused by tuberculosis damage was done by either removing ribs, raising the diaphragm, or implanting fluids or solid materials into lung cavity as a less invasive alternative to artificial pneumothorax. These treatments fell out of favor with the invention anti-tuberculosis drugs in the mid-20th century and have not seen a revival with MDR-TB, except for thoracoplasty done with implanted muscle tissue. Surgically removing portions of the lung, called lung resectioning, was a mostly theoretical possibility until the improved surgical tools and techniques of the mid-20th century. As of 2016, surgery is typically performed after 6–8 months of unsuccessful anti-TB treatment by other means. Surgical treatment has a high success rate, upwards of 80%, but a similarly high failure rate of upwards of 10% including the risk of death. Surgery is first focused on stabilizing cavities, or "destroyed lung", caused by the disease, followed by the removal of tuberculomas, and then the removal of fluid and pus buildup. Tuberculosis and lung cancer can coexist in patients as a possible complication, however the surgical therapies are similar as lung cancer surgery has its roots in aforementioned tuberculosis treatments.

== Epidemiology ==
Cases of multidrug resistant tuberculosis

Cases of MDR tuberculosis have been reported in every country surveyed. MDR-TB most commonly develops in the course of TB treatment,

and is most commonly due to doctors giving inappropriate treatment, or patients missing doses or failing to complete their treatment. Because MDR tuberculosis is an airborne pathogen, persons with active, pulmonary tuberculosis caused by a multidrug-resistant strain can transmit the disease through coughing. TB strains are often less fit and less transmissible, and outbreaks occur more readily in people with weakened immune systems (e.g., patients with HIV). Outbreaks among non-immunocompromised healthy people do occur, but are less common.

As of 2013, 3.7% of new tuberculosis cases have MDR-TB. Levels are much higher in those previously treated for tuberculosis – about 20%. WHO estimates that there were about 0.5 million new MDR-TB cases in the world in 2011. About 60% of these cases occurred in Brazil, China, India, the Russian Federation and South Africa alone. In Moldova, the crumbling health system has led to the rise of MDR-TB. In 2013, the Mexico–United States border was noted to be "a very hot region for drug resistant TB", though the number of cases remained small.

A study in Los Angeles, California, found that only 6% of cases of MDR-TB were clustered. Likewise, the appearance of high rates of MDR-TB in New York City in the early 1990s was associated with the explosion of AIDS in that area. In New York City, a report issued by city health authorities states that fully 80 percent of all MDR-TB cases could be traced back to prisons and homeless shelters. When patients have MDR-TB, they require longer periods of treatment. Several of the less powerful second-line drugs, which are required to treat MDR-TB, are also more toxic, with side effects such as nausea, abdominal pain, and even psychosis. The Partners in Health team had treated patients in Peru who were sick with strains that were resistant to ten and even twelve drugs. Most such patients require adjuvant surgery for any hope of a cure.

=== Somalia ===
MDR-TB is widespread in Somalia, where 8.7% of newly discovered TB cases are resistant to Rifampicin and Isoniazid, in patients which were treated previously the share was 47%.

Refugees from Somalia brought an until then unknown variant of MDR tuberculosis with them to Europe. A few number of cases in four different countries were considered by the European Centre for Disease Prevention and Control to pose no risk to the native population.

=== Russian prisons ===
One of the so-called "hot-spots" of drug-resistant tuberculosis is within the Russian prison system. Infectious disease researchers Nachega & Chaisson report that 10% of the one million prisoners within the system have active TB. One of their studies found that 75% of newly diagnosed inmates with TB are resistant to at least one drug; 40% of new cases are multidrug-resistant. In 1997, TB accounted for almost half of all Russian prison deaths, and as Bobrik et al. point out in their public health study, the 90% reduction in TB incidence contributed to a consequential fall in the prisoner death rate in the years following 1997. Baussano et al. articulate that concerning statistics like these are especially worrisome because spikes in TB incidence in prisons are linked to corresponding outbreaks in surrounding communities. Additionally, rising rates of incarceration, especially in Central Asian and Eastern European countries like Russia, have been correlated with higher TB rates in civilian populations. Even as the DOTS program is expanded throughout Russian prisons, researchers such as Shin et al. have noted that wide-scale interventions have not had their desired effect, especially with regard to the spread of drug-resistant strains of TB.

==== Contributing factors ====
There are several elements of the Russian prison system that enable the spread of MDR-TB and heighten its severity. Overcrowding in prisons is especially conducive to the spread of tuberculosis; an inmate in a prison hospital has (on average) 3 meters of personal space, and an inmate in a correctional colony has 2 meters. Specialized hospitals and treatment facilities within the prison system, known as TB colonies, are intended to isolate infected prisoners to prevent transmission; however, as Ruddy et al. demonstrate, there are not enough of these colonies to sufficiently protect staff and other inmates. Additionally, many cells lack adequate ventilation, which increases likelihood of transmission. Bobrik et al. have also noted food shortages within prisons, which deprive inmates of the nutrition necessary for healthy functioning.

Comorbidity of HIV within prison populations has also been shown to worsen health outcomes. Nachega & Chaisson articulate that while HIV-infected prisoners are not more susceptible MDR-TB infection, they are more likely to progress to serious clinical illness if infected. According to Stern, HIV infection is 75 times more prevalent in Russian prison populations than in the civilian population. Therefore, prison inmates are both more likely to become infected with MDR-TB initially and to experience severe symptoms because of previous exposure to HIV.

Shin et al. emphasize another factor in MDR-TB prevalence in Russian prisons: alcohol and substance use. Ruddy et al. showed that risk for MDR-TB is three times higher among recreational drug users than non-users. Shin et al.'s study demonstrated that alcohol usage was linked to poorer outcomes in MDR-TB treatment; they also noted that a majority of subjects within their study (many of whom regularly used alcohol) were nevertheless cured by their aggressive treatment regimen.

Non-compliance with treatment plans is often cited as a contributor to MDR-TB transmission and mortality. Indeed, of the 80 newly released TB-infected inmates in Fry et al.'s study, 73.8% did not report visiting a community dispensary for further treatment. Ruddy et al. cite release from facilities as one of the main causes of interruption in prisoner's TB treatment, in addition to non-compliance within the prison and upon reintegration into civilian life. Fry et al.'s study also listed side effects of TB treatment medications (especially in HIV positive individuals), financial worries, housing insecurities, family problems, and fear of arrest as factors that prevented some prisoners from properly adhering to TB treatment. They also note that some researchers have argued that the short-term gains TB-positive prisoners receive, such as better food or work exclusion, may dis-incentivize becoming cured. In their World Health Organization article, Gelmanova et al. posit that non-adherence to TB treatment indirectly contributes to bacterial resistance. Although ineffective or inconsistent treatment does not "create" resistant strains, mutations within the high bacterial load in non-adherent prisoners can cause resistance.

Nachega & Chaisson argue that inadequate TB control programs are the strongest driver of MDR-TB incidence. They note that prevalence of MDR-TB is 2.5 times higher in areas of poorly controlled TB. Russian-based therapy (i.e., not DOTS) has been criticized by Kimerling et al. as "inadequate" in properly controlling TB incidence and transmission. Bobrik et al. note that treatment for MDR-TB is equally inconsistent; the second-line drugs used to treat the prisoners lack specific treatment guidelines, infrastructure, training, or follow-up protocols for prisoners reentering civilian life.

==== Policy impacts ====
As Ruddy et al. note, Russia's early 2000s penal reforms could greatly reduce the number of inmates inside prison facilities and thus increase the number of ex-convicts integrated into civilian populations. Because the incidence of MDR-TB is strongly predicted by past imprisonment, the health of Russian society will be greatly impacted by this change. Formerly incarcerated Russians will re-enter civilian life and remain within that sphere; as they live as civilians, they will infect others with the contagions they were exposed to in prison. Researcher Vivian Stern argues that the risk of transmission from prison populations to the general public calls for an integration of prison healthcare and national health services to better control both TB and MDR-TB. While second-line drugs necessary for treating MDR-TB are arguably more expensive than a typical regimen of DOTS therapy, infectious disease specialist Paul Farmer posits that the outcome of leaving infected prisoners untreated could cause a massive outbreak of MDR-TB in civilian populations, thereby inflicting a heavy toll on society.

== See also ==
- 2007 tuberculosis scare
- Drug resistance
- MRSA
- Vancomycin-resistant enterococcus (VRE)
- Totally drug-resistant tuberculosis (TDR-TB)
- Medicines Patent Pool
