= Capreomycin =

Pharmaceutical drug

Clinical data
- Trade names: Capastat
- AHFS/Drugs.com: Monograph
- MedlinePlus: a682860
- Routes of administration: Intramuscular
- ATC code: J04AB30 (WHO)

Identifiers
- IUPAC name: (3S)-3,6-diamino-N-[[(2S,5S,8E,11S,15S)-15-amino-11-[(4R)-2-amino-3,4,5,6-tetrahydropyrimidin-4-yl]-8-[(carbamoylamino)methylidene]-2-(hydroxymethyl)-3,6,9,12,16-pentaoxo-1,4,7,10,13-pentazacyclohexadec-5-yl]methyl]hexanamide; (3S)-3,6-diamino-N-[[(2S,5S,8E,11S,15S)-15-amino-11-[(4R)-2-amino-3,4,5,6-tetrahydropyrimidin-4-yl]-8-[(carbamoylamino)methylidene]-2-methyl-3,6,9,12,16-pentaoxo-1,4,7,10,13-pentazacyclohexadec-5-yl]methyl]hexanamide
- CAS Number: 11003-38-6
- PubChem CID: 3000502
- DrugBank: DB00314
- ChemSpider: 2272094
- UNII: 232HYX66HC
- KEGG: D07607
- ChEMBL: ChEMBL2221250
- NIAID ChemDB: 007653
- CompTox Dashboard (EPA): DTXSID8040989

Chemical and physical data
- Formula: C_{25}H_{44}N_{14}O_{8}
- Molar mass: 668.717 g·mol^{−1}
- 3D model (JSmol): Interactive image
- SMILES: C[C@H]1C(=O)N[C@H](C(=O)N/C(=C/NC(=O)N)/C(=O)N[C@H](C(=O)NC[C@@H](C(=O)N1)N)[C@H]2CCN=C(N2)N)CNC(=O)C[C@H](CCCN)N.C1CN=C(N[C@H]1[C@H]2C(=O)NC[C@@H](C(=O)N[C@H](C(=O)N[C@H](C(=O)N/C(=C/NC(=O)N)/C(=O)N2)CNC(=O)C[C@H](CCCN)N)CO)N)N
- InChI: InChI=1S/C25H44N14O8.C25H44N14O7/c26-4-1-2-11(27)6-17(41)32-8-14-20(43)35-15(9-34-25(30)47)21(44)39-18(13-3-5-31-24(29)38-13)23(46)33-7-12(28)19(42)37-16(10-40)22(45)36-14;1-11-19(41)36-15(9-32-17(40)7-12(27)3-2-5-26)21(43)37-16(10-34-25(30)46)22(44)39-18(14-4-6-31-24(29)38-14)23(45)33-8-13(28)20(42)35-11/h9,11-14,16,18,40H,1-8,10,26-28H2,(H,32,41)(H,33,46)(H,35,43)(H,36,45)(H,37,42)(H,39,44)(H3,29,31,38)(H3,30,34,47);10-15,18H,2-9,26-28H2,1H3,(H,32,40)(H,33,45)(H,35,42)(H,36,41)(H,37,43)(H,39,44)(H3,29,31,38)(H3,30,34,46)/b15-9+;16-10+/t11-,12-,13+,14-,16-,18-;11-,12-,13-,14+,15-,18-/m00/s1; Key:VCOPTHOUUNAYKQ-WBTCAYNUSA-N

Capreomycin is an antibiotic which is given in combination with other antibiotics for the treatment of tuberculosis. Specifically it is a second line treatment used for active drug resistant tuberculosis. It is given by injection into a vein or muscle.

Common side effects include kidney problems, hearing problems, poor balance, and pain at the site of injection. Other side effects include paralysis resulting in the inability to breathe. It is not recommended with streptomycin or other medications that may damage the auditory vestibular nerve. It is not recommended during pregnancy as it may cause kidney or hearing problems in the baby. Capreomycin is commonly grouped with the aminoglycoside family of medications. How it works is unclear.

Capreomycin was discovered from Streptomyces capreolus in 1960. It was removed from the World Health Organization's List of Essential Medicines in 2019.

== Spectrum of susceptibility ==
Capreomycin is most commonly used to treat Mycobacterium tuberculosis infections. Mycobacterium tuberculosis growth has been found to be inhibited at a concentration of 2.5 μg/mL.

== Side effects ==
High incidence: hematuria, urine output or urinary frequency significantly increased or decreased, loss of appetite or extreme thirst (hypokalemia, renal toxicity).

Less incidence: hearing loss, tinnitus, gait instability, dizziness, dyspnea, lethargy, extreme weakness (neuromuscular blockade, renal toxicity, hypokalemia), nausea or vomiting.

Significant renal toxicity: blood creatinine increase, blood urea nitrogen increase, poor creatinine clearance, proteinuria (need routine blood monitoring of renal functions and urine analysis) during usage of this medication.

Damaging to the 8th cranial nerve . There can be vestibular dysfunction, such as some minor hearing loss after using the medication for 2 to 4 months.

A certain block effect of neuromuscular.

Can cause allergic reactions: rash, drug fever, facial flushing or pale, asthma, palpitations, sense of suppression in the chest, abdominal pain, anaphylactic shock.

== Interactions ==
Combined with an aminoglycoside, it can increase the possibility of ototoxicity, nephrotoxicity and neuromuscular blockage, result in some hearing loss or can continue to deafness. It could be a temporary symptom, but often be permanent. Neuromuscular blockade can lead to skeletal muscle weakness and respiratory depression or paralysis (apnea). Using anti-cholinesterase or calcium salts may release this block.

Combined with amphotericin B, vancomycin, bacitracin, paromomycin, cyclosporine, kanamycin, cisplatin, bumetanide, etoricoxib, furosemide: Would Increase the possibility of ototoxicity and nephrotoxicity.

Combined with antihistamines, buclizine, cyclizine, meclizine, phenothiazines, thioketones, trimethamine, and capreomycin: can ameliorate the symptoms of tinnitus, dizziness or vertigo and other ototoxic symptoms.

Combined with anti-neuromuscular block drugs: can antagonize the effect of the anti-neuromuscular block drugs on the skeletal muscle (so need to adjust the dose of the drugs for anti-muscle weakness.

Combined with ethyl sulfide isoniazid: may increase the side effects.

Combined with methoxyflurane or polymyxin injection: may increase renal toxicity or neuromuscular blockade effect.

Combined with opioid: The effect of central respiratory inhibition may increase, lead to prolonged respiratory inhibition or respiratory paralysis (apnea).

== History ==
Capreomycin, an antiphlogistic antibiotic which was produced in the United States in 1960, and be applied in clinic in 1968. In 1979, capreomycin was used in the area of antituberculosis by inhibiting the growth of Mycobacterium tuberculosis.
