= List of β-lactam antibiotics =

The β-lactam core structures. (A) A penam. (B) A carbapenam. (C) An oxapenam. (D) A penem. (E) A carbapenem. (F) A monobactam. (G) A cephem. (H) A carbacephem. (I) An oxacephem.

This is a list of common β-lactam antibiotics—both administered drugs and those not in clinical use—organized by structural class. Antibiotics are listed alphabetically within their class or subclass by their nonproprietary name. If an antibiotic is a combination drug, both ingredients will be listed.

== Penams ==
Penicillin G

Amoxicillin

=== Narrow-spectrum ===
==== β-lactamase-sensitive ====
- Benzathine
- benzylpenicillin (Penicillin G)
- Benzathine penicillin G
- Benzathine penicillin V
- Phenoxymethylpenicillin (penicillin V)
- Procaine penicillin
- Pheneticillin

==== β-lactamase-resistant ====
- Cloxacillin
- Dicloxacillin
- Flucloxacillin
- Methicillin
- Nafcillin
- Oxacillin
- Temocillin

=== Broad spectrum ===
- Amoxicillin
- Ampicillin

=== Extended spectrum (Antipseudomonal) ===
- Mecillinam
- Piperacillin
- Carbenicillin
- Ticarcillin

==== Carboxypenicillins ====
- Carbenicillin
- Ticarcillin

==== Ureidopenicillins ====
- Azlocillin
- Mezlocillin
- Piperacillin

== Cephems ==
Cephalosporin C

Cefoxitin

=== First generation (moderate spectrum) ===
- Cefazolin
- Cephalexin
- Cephalosporin C
- Cephalothin
- Cefapirin

=== Second generation (moderate spectrum) ===
cefuroxime, cefaclor, cefprozil

==== With anti-Haemophilus activity ====
- Cefaclor
- Cefamandole
- Cefuroxime

==== With anti-anaerobic activity ====
- Cefotetan
- Cefoxitin

=== Third generation (broad spectrum) ===
- Cefixime
- Cefotaxime
- Cefpodoxime
- Ceftazidime
- Ceftriaxone
- Cefdinir

=== Fourth generation (broad spectrum) ===
(With β-lactamase stability and enhanced activity against Gram-positive bacteria and Pseudomonas aeruginosa)

- Cefepime
- Cefpirome

=== Fifth generation* (broad spectrum) ===
(activity against MRSA and variably VRE. *Not universally accepted nomenclature. NO Antipseudomonal activity, mostly ceftriaxone coverage with additional MRSA and some VRE)

- Ceftaroline, Ceftobiprole

== Carbapenems and penems ==
(Broadest spectrum of β-lactam antibiotics)

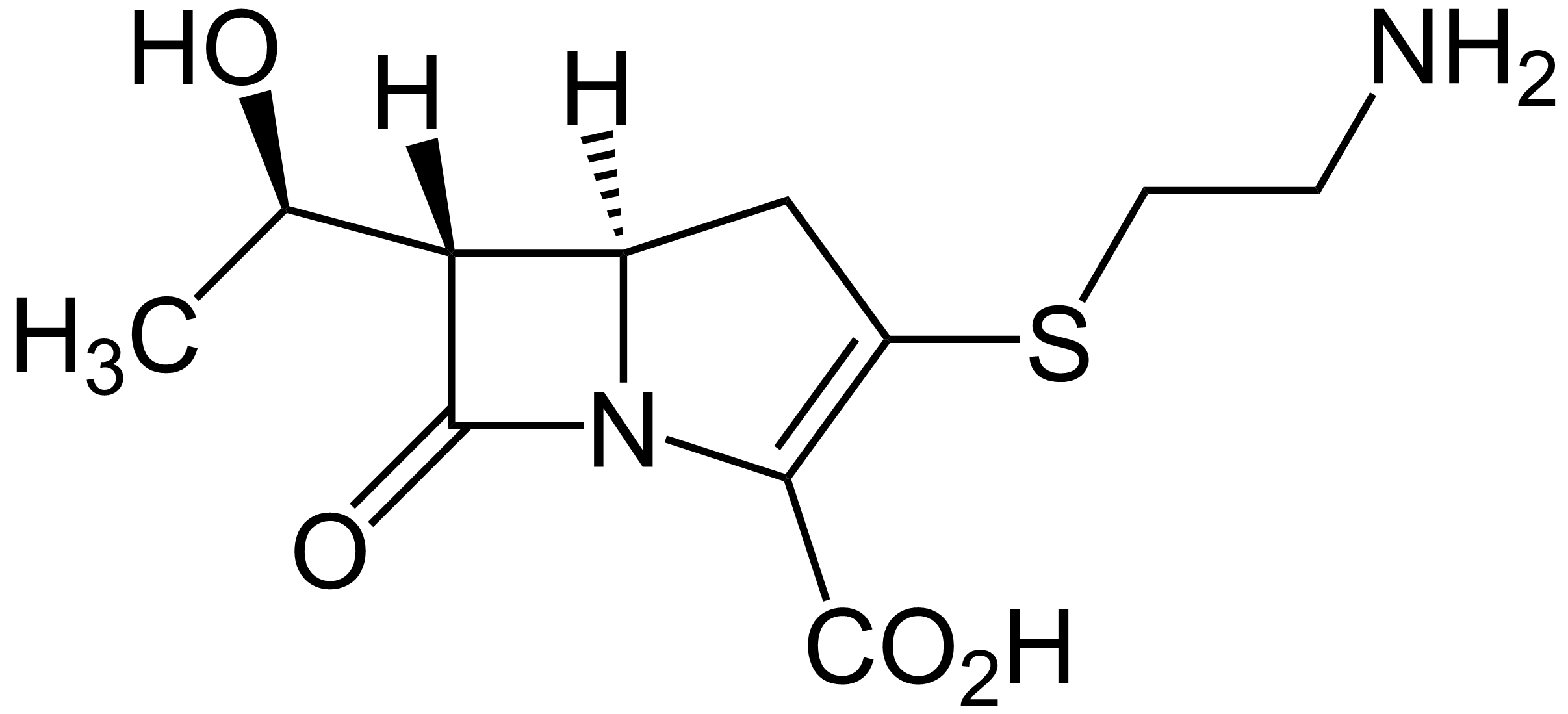
Thienamycin

- Biapenem
- Doripenem
- Ertapenem
- Faropenem
- Imipenem
- Meropenem
- Panipenem
- Razupenem
- Tebipenem pivoxil
- Thienamycin

== Monobactams ==
Aztreonam

- Aztreonam
- Tigemonam
- Nocardicin A
- Tabtoxinine β-lactam (does not inhibit penicillin-binding proteins)

== β-lactamase inhibitors ==
Clavulanic Acid

- Clavulanic acid
- Tazobactam
- Sulbactam
- Avibactam
