= Carbapenem-resistant enterobacteriaceae =

Antibiotic-resistant bacteria

Carbapenem-resistant Enterobacteriaceae (CRE) or carbapenemase-producing Enterobacteriaceae (CPE) are gram-negative bacteria that are resistant to the carbapenem class of antibiotics, considered the drugs of last resort for such infections. They are resistant because they produce an enzyme called a carbapenemase that disables the drug molecule. The resistance can vary from moderate to severe. Enterobacteriaceae are common gastrointestinal commensals and infectious agents. Experts fear CRE as the new "superbug". The bacteria can kill up to half of patients who get bloodstream infections. Tom Frieden, former head of the Centers for Disease Control and Prevention has referred to CRE as "Nightmare bacteria". Examples of enzymes found in certain types of CRE are KPC (Klebsiella pneumoniae carbapenemase) and NDM (New Delhi Metallo-beta-lactamase). KPC and NDM are enzymes that break down carbapenems and make them ineffective. Both of these enzymes, as well as the enzyme VIM (Verona Integron-Mediated Metallo-β-lactamase) have also been reported in Pseudomonas.

== Definition ==
Carbapenem-resistant Enterobacteriaceae (CRE) have been defined as carbapenem-nonsusceptible and extended-spectrum cephalosporin-resistant Escherichia coli, Enterobacter aerogenes, Enterobacter cloacae complex, Klebsiella pneumoniae, or Klebsiella oxytoca. Some exclude ertapenem resistance from the definition.

== Risk factors ==
Hospitals are primary transmission sites for CRE-based infections. Up to 75% of hospital admissions attributed to CRE were from long-term care facilities or transferred from another hospital. Suboptimal maintenance practices are the largest cause of CRE transmission. This includes the failure to adequately clean and disinfect medication cabinets, other surfaces in patient rooms, and portable medical equipment, such as X-ray and ultrasound machines that are used for both CRE and non-CRE patients. Thus far, CRE have primarily been nosocomial infectious agents. Almost all CRE infections occur in people receiving significant medical care in hospitals, long-term acute care facilities, or nursing homes. Independent risk factors for CRE infection include use of beta-lactam antibiotics and the use of mechanical ventilation. Patients with diabetes have also been shown to be at an elevated risk for acquiring CRE infections. When compared to other hospitalized patients, those admitted from long-term acute care (LTAC) facilities have significantly higher incidence of colonization and infection rates. Another 2012 multicenter study found that over 30% of patients with recent exposure to LTAC were colonized or infected with CRE. A person susceptible to CRE transmission is more likely to be female, have a greater number of parenteral nutrition-days (days when the person received nutrition via the bloodstream), and to have had a significant number of days breathing through a ventilator. Infections with carbapenem-resistant Klebsiella pneumoniae were associated with organ/stem cell transplantation, mechanical ventilation, exposure to antimicrobials, and overall longer length of stay in hospitals. People most likely to acquire carbapenem-resistant bacteria are those already receiving medical attention. In a study carried out at Sheba medical center, there was a trend toward worse Charleson Comorbidity scores in patients who acquired CRKP during ICU stay. Those at highest risk are patients receiving an organ or stem cell implantation, use of mechanical ventilation, or have to have an extended stay in the hospital along with exposure to antimicrobials. A study performed in Singapore, on the acquisition of ertapenem-resistant Enterobacteriaceae to the acquisition of CRE. revealed that exposure to antibiotics, especially fluoroquinolones and previous hospitalization dramatically increased the risk of acquisition carbapenem-resistant bacteria. This study found that carbapenem-resistant acquisition has a significantly higher mortality rate and poorer clinical response compared to that of the ertapenem-resistance acquisition.

Bacteruria (also known as urinary tract infection) caused by CRKp and CSKp have similar risk factors. These include prior antibiotic use, admittance to an ICU, use of a permanent urinary catheter, and previous invasive procedures or operations. A retrospective study of patients with CRKp and CSKp infection asserted that the use of cephalosporins (a class of β-lactam antibiotics) used before invasive procedures was higher in patients with CRKp infection, suggesting that it is a risk factor.

In a three-year study, the prevalence of CRE was shown to be proportional to the lengths of stays of the patients in those hospitals. Policies regarding contact precaution for patients infected or colonized by gram-negative pathogens were also observed in hospitals reporting decreases in CRE prevalence.

One case study showed that patients with a compromised immune response are especially susceptible to both CRE exposure and infection. In one study, an elderly patient with acute lymphoblastic leukemia being treated in a long-term care facility contracted a CRE infection. Her age and condition, combined with her environment and regulation by a catheter and mechanical ventilation, all contributed to a higher susceptibility.

Another major risk factor is being in a country with unregulated antibiotic distribution. In countries where antibiotics are over-the-counter and obtainable without a prescription, the incidence and prevalence of CRE infections were higher. One study from Japan found that 6.4% of healthy adults carried ESBL (mostly cefotaximase)-producing strains compared to 58.4% in Thailand, where antibiotics are available over the counter and without prescription. An Egyptian research group found that 63.3% of healthy adults were colonized.

In February 2015, the FDA reported about a transmission risk when people undergo a gastroenterology procedure called endoscopic retrograde cholangiopancreatography, where an endoscope enters the mouth, passes the stomach, and ends in the duodenum; if incompletely disinfected, the device can transmit CRE from one patient to another. The FDA's safety communication came a day after the UCLA Health System, Los Angeles, notified more than 100 patients that they may have been infected with CRE during endoscopies between October 2014 and January 2015. The FDA had issued its first notice about the devices in 2009.

=== Transmission by animals ===
Because the spread of CRE bacteria from animals to humans may become a problem in the future, it is advised to monitor CRE in livestock, as well as humans.

== Mechanism ==
=== Antibiotic function ===
The β-lactam family of antibiotic molecules consists of four groups: penicillins, cephalosporins, carbapenems (such as imipenem, ertapenem, meropenem and doripenem) and monobactams.

These antibiotics share common structure and mechanism of action. They enter the periplasmic space through porins, where they then inhibit transpeptidases (which are also known as penicillin-binding proteins (PBPs)), enzymes that facilitate peptide cross-links during cell wall synthesis. Their binding to the PBP active site is facilitated in part by their common structure, which is similar to that of D-alanyl-D-alanine. D-Alanyl-D-alanine is a residue on the NAM peptide subunit involved in building peptidoglycan. Carbapenem covalently binds to PBPs, which causes transpeptidases to irreversibly lose their catalytic activity. Inhibition of transpeptidases prevents the formation of cross-links between peptidoglycan polymers and causes a build-up of peptidoglycan precursors. Newly formed peptidoglycan is weakened from the absence of cross-linkages. The continued activity of autolysins, that function like lysozymes and cleave glycosidic and peptide bonds of peptidoglycan in periplasm, weakens the cell wall and leads to osmotic bursting of the bacterial cell.

One notable property of carbapenems is their resistance to hydrolysis by bacterial plasmid and chromosomally mediated extended-spectrum β-lactamases (ESBL).

=== Carbapenem resistance ===
In general, carbapenem, a β-lactam antibiotic, targets cells by inhibiting transpeptidases (penicillin-binding proteins). This prevents synthesis of peptidoglycan, a necessary structural component, leading to cell lysis. Resistance to carbapenem among Enterobacteriaceae and other gram-negative bacteria can be acquired through several mechanisms.

1. Active transport of carbapenem drugs out of the cell, augmented drug efflux, has been observed in some resistant species.
2. One mechanism of resistance is mutation in or loss of outer membrane porins, preventing antibiotics from entering the cells. Changes within the porin protein gene cause a frameshift, altering the porin structure and function. Changes in the porin protein hinder the diffusion of carbapenem and other antibiotics into the periplasm. Bacteria that express plasmid-borne extended-spectrum β-lactamases (ESBL) can become carbapenem-resistant if an insertion sequence or four-nucleotide duplication is present within chromosomal genes for outer membrane porin proteins. Klebsiella pneumoniae has been associated with the lack of outer membrane porin proteins, OmpK35 and OmpK36. The loss of OmpK36 porins can be attributed to point mutations that result in premature termination of translation, resulting in a truncated and consequently nonfunctional protein. These outer membrane proteins are involved in the transfer of the antimicrobial genetic material in the cell. Loss of either OmpK35 and OmpK36 or only OmpK36 leads to carbapenem resistance. In Klebsiella pneumoniae, the lack of either OmpK35 or OmpK36 leads to carbapenem resistance, but with the lack of both proteins, a high level of resistance is present. An observed 32- to 64-fold increase in minimum inhibitory concentrations occurs for the carbapenems when both proteins are not expressed.
3. CRE produce carbapenemases, a form of β-lactamase. These enzymes cleave the β-lactam ring, an essential component of β-lactam antibiotics that are recognized by and bound to PBPs. Carbapenemases are divided into different classes, depending on the structure of the enzyme and the mechanism by which they hydrolyze the β-lactam ring. The two broad categories of carbapenemases are serine-carbapenemases, which contain serine at the active site, and metallocarbapenemases, which contain zinc at the active site. Class A carbapenemases are serine carbapenemases and are encoded on either the chromosome of the bacteria or a plasmid. A serine at position 70 at the active site of this class of enzymes is required for hydrolysis of β-lactams to occur. Class D carbapenemases, also referred to as the OXA β-lactamases, are serine β-lactamases. They are encoded on plasmids and contain a large variability in amino acid sequence. The resistance mechanism for class D carbapenemases is caused by the formation of an acyl intermediate when breaking the β-lactam ring. Class B carbapenemases are metallolactamases and require a zinc at the active site for hydrolysis.
4. A clinical isolate of E. coli from the sputum sample of a patient admitted to a Beijing hospital was found to acquire resistance to carbapenem through mutations not previously observed. It involved a mutation of a regulator gene marR and the expression of a normally nontranslated membrane porin yedS; both mutations were demonstrated to have effects on the ability of this strain of E.coli to resist carbapenems. The strain lacked the outer membrane proteins OmpF and OmpC, and showed increased expression of a multidrug efflux pump, but did not produce carbapenemase.

CR Pseudomonas aeruginosa is commonly present in intensive-care units, and can lead to dangerous infections. In Thai hospitals, of 261 multidrug-resistant samples collected of P. aeruginosa (not part of the Enterobacteriaceae), 71.65% were carbapenem-resistant.

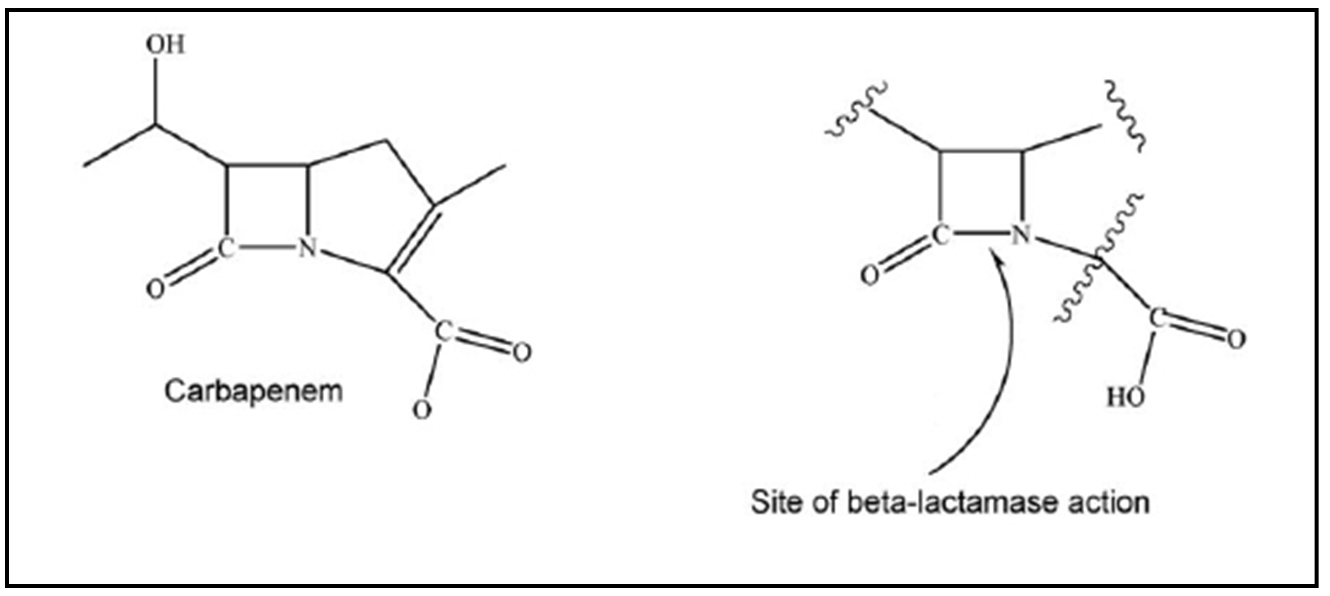
Site of cleavage by beta-lactamase

=== Transfer between bacteria ===
Gram-negative bacteria can develop and transfer β-lactam resistance (including carbapenem resistance) in many ways. They can generate new extended-spectrum β-lactamases (ESBL) from the existing spectrum of plasmid-mediated β-lactamases through amino acid substitution. They can acquire genes encoding ESBL from environmental bacteria. They can increase the expression of chromosome-encoded β-lactamase genes (bla genes) due to regulatory gene and promoter sequence modifications. They can mobilize bla genes through integrons or horizontal transfer of genomic islands into other gram-negative species and strains. They can disseminate plasmid-mediated carbapenemases. Finally, they can lower or even inhibit the expression of porin genes.

Three major classes of enzymes are involved in carbapenem resistance: class A carbapenemases, class B metallo-β-lactamases (MBL), and class D β-lactamases (OXA). The four known groups of class A carbapenemases are: SME (three types associated with S. marcescens), IMI (present in E. cloacae), GES (16 variants thus far found in P. aeruginosa predominantly but also found in K. pneumoniae and E. coli), and KPC (10 types of K. pneumoniae carbapenemase). At the UVA Medical Center, a transfer mechanism of KPC-dependent carbapenem resistance was discovered in the transmission of a plasmid carrying the transposon (Tn4401), which contains the KPC gene (bla_{KPC}), to several bacteria including Enterobacter cloacae, Klebsiella oxytoca, E. coli, and Citrobacter freundii. The class B metallo-β-lactamases (MBLs) are found largely in gram-negative bacteria and environmental bacteria. The subclasses of MBL enzymes are B1, B2, and B3. MBLs have diverse enzymatic functions and have the ability to hydrolyze β-lactam antibiotics. The class D β-lactamases (OXA), which hydrolyze oxacillin, provide a good example of the variety of mechanisms that can be used to transfer resistance. The bla_{OXA} genes which encode OXA β-lactamases are found on both chromosomes and plasmids, and they have their natural reservoir in environmental bacteria and deep-sea microflora. Insertions in the vicinity of these genes have been shown to increase the strength of their promoters and increase resistance. Because of these characteristics, a wide geographic dissemination of OXA carbapenemase resistance in particular has occurred.

The facilitated spread of carbapenem resistance appears to have multiple origins and repeated introduction into the UK of bacteria with the bla_{OXA-48} gene via horizontal transfer of similar plasmids to pOXA-48a.

- The Indian strain of K. pneumoniae had an OXA-181-encoding plasmid (which had higher resistance to carbapenem) and also could not be transferred by conjugation and had none of the three functional genes found in pOXA-48a.

==== OXA-48-like carbapenemases ====
The spread of OXA-48 carbapenem resistance involves both the expansion of successful bacterial clones and the movement of bla_{OXA-48} between bacteria on mobile genetic elements. The gene is commonly associated with Tn1999-family transposons carried on highly conjugative IncL plasmids, although OXA-48-like genes also occur in other plasmid types and chromosomal contexts.

A community outbreak in New Zealand during 2018–2022 involved 25 patients with OXA-48-producing Escherichia coli sequence type 131. Eighteen patients had visited the same community food premises, where four food handlers were also found to be colonized, and whole-genome sequencing demonstrated genomic links between patient and food-handler isolates. Subsequent long-read genomic analysis found that the outbreak lineage had acquired bla_{OXA-48} on a 7,872-base-pair Col156 plasmid and identified a single IS1-mediated transposition of the resistance gene into the Col156 plasmid backbone. Analysis of global genomic data showed that bla_{OXA-48} occurs in diverse plasmid and insertion-sequence contexts among Enterobacterales.

==== Gram-negative bacteria ====
Outer membrane vesicles (OMVs), that can transfer DNA between bacterial cells, are produced by metabolically active bacterial cells, and the OMVs are not the result of cell lysis or cell death. Pathogenic strains can produce about 10-25 times more vesicles than a nonpathogenic strain making this highly relevant to carbapenem resistance transfer. OMVs protect plasmids from being digested extracellularly by nucleases that may be found in the environment, thus favoring horizontal gene transfer.

== Laboratory analysis ==
=== Agar plate method ===
Variations are seen in the media used for inoculation. Many studies use media with 1 to 2 mg/L of imipenem. However, bacteria that produce OXA-48 or OXA-181 result in low-level resistance, which cannot be detected efficiently due to the high concentration. Therefore, more recent screening media use broth containing 0.5–1 mg/L imipenem or 0.5 mg/L ertapenem. The downsides to this approach include the delay of results from the inoculation and the inability to identify the type of carbapenemase.

=== Disc diffusion method ===
The disc diffusion method can be used by hospital laboratories to screen for CRE. In this technique, antibiotic discs are placed onto plates of Mueller Hinton agar that have already been inoculated with the sample strain. The plates are then incubated overnight at 37 °C. Following incubation, the zones of inhibition surrounding the various antibiotic discs are measured and compared with Clinical and Laboratory Standard Institute guidelines. Identification of KPCs, MBLs and OXAs can be achieved by demonstrating synergistic inhibition with phenyl boronic acid, EDTA or neither, respectively.

In a Thailand-based study of CRE in hospital settings, carbapenem resistance was defined as any strain that shows resistance to at least one of three carbapenem antibiotics tested.

=== PCR method ===
PCR-based screening methodologies are in the process of development for a number of genes responsible for resistance. They speed up detection and can readily differentiate between carbapenamase genes-sometimes in a multiplex format. Costs of PCR testing are decreasing and reliability of molecular based tests relates more to gene presence and gene expression for production of the relevant carbapenamase. Nested arbitrary PCR (ARB-PCR) was used during a 2007 CRE outbreak at the University of Virginia Medical Center to identify the specific bla KPC plasmid involved in the transmission of the infection, and researchers suggest that ARB-PCR may also be used to identify other methods of CRE spread.

=== MALDI-TOF MS ===
Another study used matrix-assisted laser desorption ionization-time of flight mass spectrometry (MALDI-TOF MS) to determine resistance patterns in bacteria from freshly positive blood cultures. MALDI-TOF MS can detect changes in mass to charge ratios. Cabapenem-resistant bacteria often employ β-lactamases, which physically disrupt the structure of β-lactam antibiotics. Since this causes a change in the mass of the antibiotic, resistant bacteria are detectable by MALDI-TOF MS. Accepted clinical tests often require an overnight incubation before reading the result, but MALDI-TOF MS can return results in just 4–5 hours.

MALDI-TOF cannot detect resistant bacteria, which do not physically disrupt the β-lactam antibiotic, i.e. where no mass change occurs. Therefore, the method serves best as a first screen for patients admitted to the hospital, but should be followed with secondary testing.

== Prevention ==
Researchers found environmental reservoirs of CRE bacteria in ICU sinks and drains. Despite multiple attempts to sterilize these sinks and drains, using detergents and steam, the hospital staff was unsuccessful in getting rid of the CRE. Due to the bacterial resistance to cleaning measures, staff should take extreme precaution in maintaining sterile environments in hospitals not yet infected with the CRE-resistant bacteria.

A major means of transmission is through sinks, so staff should take extra precaution in maintaining sterile conditions. Hospitals could reduce transmission by creating sinks with designs that could reduce backsplash. Another method to reduce transmission from sink to sink is to have sink brushes in each room that would be for cleaning that individual sink alone. Hospital staff should be trained to never dispose of clinical waste down the sinks in patient rooms. A hospital in Melbourne, Australia, implemented similar strategies as these to reduce transmission and prevent further infection of more ICU patients. Armed with the knowledge of their status as CRE transmission sites, hospitals must take special care to monitor CRE outbreaks within their wards. Efficient and accurate detection of CRE is the first step. Enterobacteriaceae are most commonly found in the intestinal flora. Using stool and rectal swabs are, thus, the most reliable methods for testing resistance.

No billing code exists for CRE under Medicare or Medicaid, making it difficult to track on a national level in the U.S. Another challenge facing efforts to control transmission is the fact that although long-term care facilities have been heavily indicated as the primary centers for incidence, amplification, and spread of CRE, studies that have controlled for this transmission have still found CRE spreading in other affiliated hospitals, indicating that long-term acute-care facilities are likely not the sole culprit in the spread of CRE and other multidrug-resistant organisms.

One method found effective is to screen and isolate incoming patients from other facilities, and renew focus on hand washing. No new drugs for the bacteria are in development and the bacteria's rapid adaptation to new drugs makes investment in their development unprofitable, as the new drug would quickly become useless. Studies have found that CRE incidence and prevalence can be reduced by applying targeted interventions including increased hygiene measures and equipment sterilization, even in populations where the prevalence of infection exceeds 50% of patients. However, additional environmental cleaning to control transmission has not been verified by controlled trials. The involvement of local and national public health authorities will likely be critical to ensure broader and more sustainable implementation of these measures.

Prevention is a top priority for reducing person-to-person transmission of CRE. This is especially true because limited treatment options are available to use after carbapenem resistance develops. Most current research calls for a coordinated, multifaceted approach to infection prevention and containment, and the Centers for Disease Control and Prevention have issued preliminary guidelines for the control of CRE transmission. Experts advocate for a proactive approach, based on the belief that it will be most cost-effective to combat the problem before it is established. However, when immediate financial and personnel resources are limited, healthcare administrators may be forced to respond reactively, aiming to reduce any further transmission.

Although a consensus exists for the need of prevention protocols, infection control practices often vary among hospitals, even within close geographic area. In a survey of 15 hospitals within the Toronto area, many hospitals employed varying combinations of basic infection control practices. Eight different practices were observed among the 15 hospitals, some of which included in the most recent publication of guidelines from the Public Health Agency of Canada. Some of these recommendations include laboratory testing, active surveillance, screening (rectal swab, urine culture), hand hygiene, personal protective equipment, environmental cleaning, laundry waste management, and isolation with dedicated equipment and nursing staff. However, only five hospitals had written policies describing how to respond to an outbreak. Many public health initiatives are moving towards a more standardized approach at multiple levels: among local facilities (especially long-term and acute care), regional hospitals, national institutions, and global practices. A standardized approach of prevention may help to more effectively reduce the emergence of CRE.

An infection control plan was implemented at the Kaplan Medical Center in Israel to control a hospital outbreak of carbapenem-resistant K. pneumoniae. The comprehensive plan included guidelines for cohorting patients in separate locations, cleaning with 1,000 ppm hypochlorite, screening for isolates from rectal swabs, and distribution of educational instruction sheets, lectures for all medical staff, and training. The hospital also implemented an automated computer system that updated patient charts when new cases were reported, if patients were carriers, and what precautions to take when dealing with such patients. This plan was evaluated in a quasiexperimental study through the incidence of clinical cases, the rate of cross-infection, and the rate of screening for carriage in admitted patients with increased risk of carriage. The study had a 16-fold decrease in the incidence of resistant K. pneumoniae, which was sustained for 30 months. The plan can provide a model for other hospitals to contain outbreaks of carbapenem-resistant bacteria. A reduction in the use of unnecessary invasive devices, including urinary catheters, could help reduce CRE transmission.

Several methods have been tested for their effectiveness at improving thorough intensive-care unit environmental hygiene. A study conducted in 2010 across 3532 high risk environmental surfaces in 260 intensive care unit rooms in 27 acute-care hospitals (ICUs) assessed the consistency at which these surfaces met base line cleaning standards. Only 49.5% of the high-risk object surfaces were found to meet this baseline criterion. The least-cleaned objects were bathroom light switches, room door knobs, and bed pan cleaners. Significant improvements in ICU room cleaning was achieved through a structured approach that incorporated a simple, highly objective surface targeting method and repeated performance feedback to environmental surface personnel. Specific methods included implementing an objective evaluation process, environmental surfaces staff education, programmatic feedback, and continuous training to minimize the spread of hospital-associated infections. The authors noted an improvement in the thoroughness of cleaning at 71% from baseline for the entire group of hospitals involved.

== Treatments ==
=== Fosfomycin ===
Several antimicrobial drugs have been tested for the effective treatment of CRE. Fosfomycin is an antimicrobial agent that acts to inhibit UDP-N-acetylglucosamine enolpyruvyl transferase (MurA) which catalyzes one of the early steps of bacterial cell wall synthesis, and is effective against gram-negative and -positive aerobic bacteria, such as CRE. A meta-analysis of 17 studies investigating the clinical effectiveness of fosfomycin in four multidrug-resistant strains of Enterobacteriaceae found 11 which reported that over 90% of bacterial isolates were susceptible to fosfomycin.

The elevated level of antimicrobial activity by fosfomycin can be attributed to the fact that resistance to this antibiotic in Enterobacteriaceae is chromosomally encoded and not plasmid-mediated. This causes a decreased capacity for survival in the bacteria. Bacteria that are naturally resistant to fosfomycin are less robust and less pathogenic.

=== Tigecycline ===
Tigecycline, a member of the glycylcyclines antibiotics, has proven to be an effective therapy against Enterobacteriaceae that typically display tetracycline resistance, because tigecycline has a higher binding affinity with ribosomal sites than tetracycline has. Tigecycline is capable of killing almost all of the ESBLs and multidrug-resistant (MDR) E. coli isolates and the large majority of ESBL and MDR isolates of Klebsiella species.

A 2008 review of 42 studies of in vitro susceptibility of bacteria to tigecycline showed that MDR K. pneumoniae and E. coli, including those that were carbapenem resistant, were susceptible more than 90% of the time. A limited number of patients have been treated with tigecycline, but the FDA has approved it in certain cases with synergies of other drugs. The limited number of patients indicates that more trials are needed to determine the overall clinical effectiveness.

Although tigecycline is one of the first lines of defense against carbapenemase-producing isolates, negative clinical outcomes with tigecycline have occurred. Both urinary tract and primary blood infections can make tigecycline ineffective, because it has limited penetration and rapid tissue diffusion after being intravenously infused, respectively.

=== Other antibiotics ===
Alternatives to fosfomycin include nitrofurantoin, pivmecillinam, and co-amoxiclav in oral treatment of urinary-tract infections associated with extended-spectrum beta-lactamase.

In a separate study, CRE were treated with colistin, amikacin, and tigecycline, and emphasizes the importance of using gentamicin in patients undergoing chemotherapy or stem-cell therapy procedures. While colistin had shown promising activity against carbapenemase-producing isolates, more recent data suggest a resistance to it is already emerging and it will soon become ineffective.

Using another antibiotic concomitantly with carbapenem can help prevent the development of carbapenem resistance. One specific study showed a higher rate of carbapenem resistance when using meropenem alone compared with combination therapy with moxifloxacin.

In addition, several drugs were tested to gauge their effectiveness against CRE infections. In vitro studies have shown that rifampin has synergistic activity against carbapenem-resistant E. coli and K. pneumoniae. However, more data are needed to determine if rifampin is effective in a clinical setting.

Several new agents are in development. The main areas where scientists are focusing is new β-lactamase inhibitors with activity against carbapenemases. Some of these include MK-7655, NXL104, and 6-alkylidenepenam sulfones. The exact way they affect the carbapenemases is unknown. Another experimental agent with activity against CRE is eravacycline.

== Epidemiology ==
Prior to 1992, CRE were relatively uncommon in the U.S. According to data from the National Nosocomial Infection Service, between 1986 and 1990, only 2.3% of 1825 Enterobacteriaceae isolates sampled were found to be resistant.

According to the U.S. Centers for Disease Control, CRE producing what was the most common type of carbapenem-destroying enzyme in 2001 were first detected in a North Carolina hospital in 1996. Since then, they have been identified in health care facilities in 41 other states. In 2012, 3% of patients in Chicago-area ICUs carried CRE. The same data indicated a 30% colonization rate in long-term care facilities (e.g. nursing homes), where patients are not symptomatic. During just the first half of 2012, almost 200 hospitals and long-term acute care facilities treated at least one patient infected with these bacteria.

CRE have become increasingly common in the US. The Meropenem Yearly Susceptibility Test Information Collection Program noted that resistance within K. pneumoniae alone increased from 0.6% in 2004 to 5.6% in 2008. The first outbreak involving colistin-resistant, carbapenem-resistant K. pneumoniae (CRKP) in the U.S. was discovered in Detroit, Michigan in 2009, involving three different healthcare institutions. In an active surveillance study in seven U.S. states over two years, the crude overall incidence of CRE was 2.93 per 100,000 population. Georgia and Maryland had a significantly higher than predicted incidence adjusted for age and race.

Increases in CRE have not been limited to the US. By 2011, CRE was reported in at least 22 countries. Between 2009 and 2012, 10 cases of CRE infections were documented in ICU patients in a Melbourne, Australia, hospital.

Some cases of CRE are associated with receipt of medical care in the US. Strains found in Israel had genetic similarity to strains from the US. Hospital handwashing stations were found to be environmental reservoirs for CRE after screening all wet-area locations, including sinks, water fountains, and ice machines. The main reservoirs for CRE were the ICU sinks, and inappropriate cleaning methods accounted for transmission from sink to sink. The CRE strains in the sinks and the strains infecting the ICU patients were identical per genetic analysis. At-risk patients were being infected in the hospital setting.

A study, conducted in 2016–2017 at a pediatric hospital in Kathmandu, Nepal, detected the presence of the blaNDM-1 gene among carbapenem-resistant Escherichia coli and Klebsiella pneumoniae isolates confirmed by the Modified Hodge Test, analyzing 1503 clinical samples collected over six months. Genetic analysis revealed that half of the E. coli and two-thirds of the K. pneumoniae carbapenemase-producing isolates carried the blaNDM-1 gene, highlighting the prevalence of this resistance mechanism in Nepal

=== Mortality ===
CRE resistance depends upon a number of factors such as the health of the patient, whether the patient has recently undergone a transplant, risk of co-infection, and use of multiple antibiotics. Carbapenem minimal inhibitory concentrations (MICs) results may be more predictive of clinical patient outcomes than the current categorical classification of the MICs being listed as susceptible, intermediate, or resistant. The study aimed to define an all-cause hospital mortality breakpoint for carbapenem MICs that were adjusted for risk factors. Another objective was to determine if a similar breakpoint existed for indirect outcomes, such as the time to death and length of stay after infection for survivors. Seventy-one patients were included, of which 52 patients survived and 19 patients died. Classification and regression tree analysis determined a split of organism MIC between 2 and 4 mg/liter and predicted differences in mortality (16.1% for 2 mg/liter versus 76.9% for 4 mg/liter). In logistic regression controlling for confounders, each imipenem MIC doubling dilution doubled the probability of death. This classification scheme correctly predicted 82.6% of cases. Patients were accordingly stratified to MICs of ≤2 mg/liter (58 patients) and ≥4 mg/liter (13 patients). Patients in the group with a MIC of ≥4 mg/liter tended to be more ill. Secondary outcomes were also similar between groups. Patients with organisms that had an MIC of ≥4 mg/liter had worse outcomes than those with isolates of an MIC of ≤2 mg/liter.

At New York Presbyterian Hospital, part of Columbia University Medical Center in New York, NY, a study was conducted on the significant rise in carbapenem resistance in K. pneumoniae from 1999 to 2007. Following a positive blood culture from a patient, overall mortality was 23% in 7 days, 42% in 30 days, and 60% by the end of hospitalization. The overall in-hospital mortality rate was 48%.

At Soroka Medical Center, an Israeli university teaching hospital, a study was done between October 2005 and October 2008 to determine the direct mortality rate associated with carbapenem-resistant K. pneumoniae bloodstream infections. The crude mortality rate for those with the resistant bacteremia was 71.9%, and the attributable mortality rate was determined to be 50% with a 95% confidence interval. The crude mortality rate for control subjects was 21.9%. As a result of the study, Soroka Medical Center started an intensive program designed to prevent the spread of carbapenem-resistant K. pneumoniae.

A 2013 retrospective study at the Shaare Zedek Medical Center of patients with urinary tract infections (bacteriuria) caused by carbapenem-resistant Klebsiella pneumoniae (CRKp) showed no statistically significant difference in mortality rates from patients with bacteriuria caused by carbapenem-susceptible K. pneumoniae (CSKp). A 29% mortality rate was seen in patients with CRKp infection compared to a 25% mortality rate in patients with CSKp infections that produced extended-spectrum beta-lactamase (ESBL). Both mortality rates were considerably higher than that of patients with drug-susceptible urosepsis. Most patients in the study had other illnesses, including dementia, immune compromise, kidney failure, or diabetes mellitus. The main risk factor for death found by the study was being bedridden, which significantly increased the chance of death. This suggests that the deaths were due to reasons other than bacteriuria. Total length of hospitalization was somewhat longer in patients with CRKp infections (28 ± 33 days compared to 22 ± 28 days for patients with CSKp infection).

In a case-control study of 99 patients compared with 99 controls at Mount Sinai Hospital (Manhattan), a 1,171 bed tertiary care teaching hospital, 38% of patients in long-term care that were affected by CRE died from K. pneumoniae infection. Patients had risk factors including diabetes, HIV infection, heart disease, liver disease, chronic kidney disease, one was a transplant recipient. 72% of patients who were released from the hospital with CRE were readmitted within 90 days. A 2008 study at Mount Sinai identified outcomes associated with Carbapenem-resistant Klebsiella pneumoniae infections, in which patients in need of organ or stem cell transplants, mechanical ventilation, prolonged hospitalization, or prior treatment with carbapenems, had an increased probability of infection with Carbapenem-resistant K. pneumoniae. A combination of antibiotics worked to treat infection and survival rates of infected patients increased when the focus of infection was removed.

CRE infections can set in about 12 days after liver transplantation, and 18% of those patients died a year after transplantation in a 2012 study.

== Public health implications ==
=== Bacterial survival on surfaces ===
Studies have found prolonged viability of bacteria on stainless-steel surfaces at room temperature. In a specific study, stainless steel was inoculated with 10^{7} CFU/cm^{2} E. coli and K. pneumoniae, containing bla_{CTX-M-15} and bla_{NDM-1} (antibiotic-resistant genes) respectively. Thirty days later (at room temperature, 22˚ C), 10^{4} viable cells remained; and, after 100 days, 100 CFU/cm^{2} of E. coli remained.

In contrast, on copper and copper alloy surfaces, rapid death of antibiotic-resistant bacterial strains, as well as destruction of plasmid and genomic DNA, can be observed. Studies suggest that exposure to dry copper surfaces inhibits the respiration and growth of producers by releasing copper ions.

Increased horizontal gene transfer (HGT) is observed simultaneously with cell viability on stainless steel surfaces. HGT is one of the major factors responsible for creating antibiotic resistance in bacteria. This suggests that immediate decontamination of surfaces is important in preventing the spread of antibiotic resistance genes. It has also been shown that horizontal transfer of antibiotic-resistant β-lactamase genes does not occur on antimicrobial copper surfaces. As copper surfaces degrade naked DNA (and plasmid DNA in antibiotic-resistant E. coli and K. pneumoniae), copper surfaces would halt HGT.

Horizontal gene transfer has been demonstrated to occur readily on dry surfaces such as stainless steel, but not on copper and copper alloy surfaces. The rate of bacterial death increased proportionally with the percentage of copper in the copper alloy surface. This can be very important in future clinical and community settings, as an increase in copper utilization in hospital room equipment could help to greatly reduce the spread of antibiotic-resistant infection and the horizontal gene transfer of this antibiotic resistance.

== See also ==
- Methicillin-resistant staph aureus (MRSA)
- Clostridioides difficile
- NDM-1
