= Dipeptidase 3 =

Protein-coding gene in the species Homo sapiens

DPEP3

Identifiers
- Aliases: DPEP3, MBD3, dipeptidase 3
- External IDs: OMIM: 609926; MGI: 1919104; GeneCards: DPEP3

Gene location (Human)
Chr.	Chromosome 16 (human)
Band	16q22.1	Start	67,975,663 bp
Band	16q22.1	End	67,980,549 bp

Gene location (Mouse)
Chr.	Chromosome 8 (mouse)
Band	8|8 D3	Start	106,700,145 bp
Band	8|8 D3	End	106,706,061 bp
RNA expression pattern
Bgee	Human / Mouse (ortholog); Top expressed in: right testis; left testis; gonad; testicle; sperm; blood; granulocyte; spleen; bone marrow; muscle of thigh / Top expressed in: spermatocyte; spermatid; seminiferous tubule; primary oocyte; morula; morula; secondary oocyte; blastocyst; Gonadal ridge; zygote; More reference expression data
BioGPS	n/a
Gene ontology
Molecular function	peptidase activity; metalloexopeptidase activity; dipeptidyl-peptidase activity; metallopeptidase activity; hydrolase activity; metal ion binding; dipeptidase activity
Cellular component	anchored component of membrane; membrane; acrosomal vesicle; plasma membrane
Biological process	male meiotic nuclear division; meiosis; proteolysis
Sources:Amigo / QuickGO
Orthologs
Databases	NCBI: entry; OMA: entry
Species	Human	Mouse
Entrez	64180	71854
Ensembl	ENSG00000141096	ENSMUSG00000031898
UniProt	Q9H4B8	Q9DA79
RefSeq (mRNA)	NM_022357; NM_001129758; NM_001370198	NM_027960
RefSeq (protein)	NP_001123230; NP_001357127	NP_082236
Location (UCSC)	Chr 16: 67.98 – 67.98 Mb	Chr 8: 106.7 – 106.71 Mb
PubMed search
- Wikidata
View/Edit Human	View/Edit Mouse

Dipeptidase 3 (DPEP3) is a protein that in humans is encoded by the DPEP3 gene.

This gene encodes a membrane-bound glycoprotein from the family of dipeptidases (EC 3.4.13.19) involved in hydrolytic metabolism of various dipeptides, including penem and carbapenem beta-lactam antibiotics. This gene is located on chromosome 16 in a cluster with another member of this family, DPEP2. Alternatively spliced transcript variants that encode different isoforms have been found for this gene.
