= Dipeptide hydrolase =

Dipeptide hydrolase may refer to:

- Membrane dipeptidase, an enzyme
- Angiotensin-converting enzyme, an enzyme
