= C6H9NO =

Molecular formula

The molecular formula C_{6}H_{9}NO may refer to:

- 2-Acetyl-1-pyrroline
- Carbapenam
- 2-Furylethylamine
- N-Vinylpyrrolidone
