= ERTA =

ERTA may refer to:

- Erta, Italian ski slope
- Ertapenem, carbapenem antibiotic medication
- The piece of American legislation, the Economic Recovery Tax Act of 1981
