= Nonspecific dipeptidase =

Nonspecific dipeptidase may refer to:

- Membrane dipeptidase, an enzyme
- Cytosol nonspecific dipeptidase, an enzyme
