= Merrem =

Merrem may refer to:

- Meropenem, an antibiotic initially marketed under the trade name Merrem
- Blasius Merrem (1761–1824), German naturalist, zoologist, ornithologist, mathematician, and herpetologist
