= Biapenem =

Chemical compound

Clinical data
- Trade names: Omegacin, Bianem
- AHFS/Drugs.com: International Drug Names
- Routes of administration: IV
- ATC code: J01DH05 (WHO)

Legal status
- Legal status: In general: ℞ (Prescription only)

Identifiers
- IUPAC name: (4R,5S,6S)-3-(6,7-Dihydro-5H-pyrazolo[1,2-a][1,2,4]triazol-8- ium-6-ylsulfanyl)-6-(1-hydroxyethyl)- 4-methyl-7-oxo-1-azabicyclo[3.2.0]hept-2-ene-2-carboxylate
- CAS Number: 120410-24-4
- PubChem CID: 71339
- ChemSpider: 64442
- UNII: YR5U3L9ZH1
- ChEBI: CHEBI:3089
- ChEMBL: ChEMBL285347
- CompTox Dashboard (EPA): DTXSID5046435

Chemical and physical data
- Formula: C_{15}H_{18}N_{4}O_{4}S
- Molar mass: 350.39 g·mol^{−1}
- 3D model (JSmol): Interactive image
- SMILES: CC1C2C(C(=O)N2C(=C1SC3CN4C=NC=[N+]4C3)C(=O)[O-])C(C)O
- InChI: InChI=1S/C15H18N4O4S/c1-7-11-10(8(2)20)14(21)19(11)12(15(22)23)13(7)24-9-3-17-5-16-6-18(17)4-9/h5-11,20H,3-4H2,1-2H3/t7-,8-,10-,11-/m1/s1; Key:MRMBZHPJVKCOMA-YJFSRANCSA-N

Biapenem (INN) is a carbapenem antibiotic sold in Japan under the brand name Omegacin, and in India as Bianem. It is a synthetic β-lactam antibiotic belonging to the carbapenems chemical class, developed by the Japanese subsidiary of Lederle Pharmaceuticals in the late 1980's.

Biapenem was approved for use in Japan in 2001, and launched to market there in 2002, with clinical trials approved in India in 2021, and full market launch later the same year. In clinical trials, it was found to be more effective at lower doses than imipenem, but less effective than equivalent doses of ceftazidime.

== Medical uses ==
Biapenem is effective against a wide range of gram-positive and gram-negative bacteria, including Escherichia coli, Klebsiella pneumoniae, Klebsiella aerogenes, Enterobacter cloacae, Citrobacter freundii, Serratia marcescens, Proteus mirabilis, Proteus vulgaris, and Morganella morganii.

Unlike some other carbapenems, notably imipenem, biapenem is not particularly susceptible to hydrolysis by human renal dihydropeptidase-I (DHP-I), meaning it can be administered effectively without an adjunct like cilastatin.

Resistance to biapenem is similar to that of imipenem, with similar mechanisms responsible. It is most frequently given as an intravenous infusion.
