= Tomopenem =

Names
- IUPAC name (4R,5S,6S)-3-[(3S,5S)-5-[(3S)-3-[[2-(diaminomethylideneamino)acetyl]amino]pyrrolidine-1-carbonyl]-1-methylpyrrolidin-3-yl]sulfanyl-6-[(1R)-1-hydroxyethyl]-4-methyl-7-oxo-1-azabicyclo[3.2.0]hept-2-ene-2-carboxylic acid

Identifiers
CAS Number	222400-20-6
3D model (JSmol)	Interactive image
ChemSpider	7985412
KEGG	D09022
PubChem CID	9809656
UNII	1654W9611T
CompTox Dashboard (EPA)	DTXSID70873384
- InChI: InChI=1S/C23H35N7O6S/c1-10-17-16(11(2)31)21(34)30(17)18(22(35)36)19(10)37-13-6-14(28(3)9-13)20(33)29-5-4-12(8-29)27-15(32)7-26-23(24)25/h10-14,16-17,31H,4-9H2,1-3H3,(H,27,32)(H,35,36)(H4,24,25,26)/t10-,11-,12+,13+,14+,16-,17-/m1/s1 Key: KEDAXBWZURNCHS-GPODMPQUSA-N
- SMILES: C[C@@H]1[C@@H]2[C@H](C(=O)N2C(=C1S[C@H]3C[C@H](N(C3)C)C(=O)N4CC[C@@H](C4)NC(=O)CNC(=N)N)C(=O)O)[C@@H](C)O

Properties
Chemical formula	C_{23}H_{35}N_{7}O_{6}S
Molar mass	537.64 g·mol^{−1}
- Except where otherwise noted, data are given for materials in their standard state (at 25 °C [77 °F], 100 kPa). Infobox references

Tomopenem (formerly CS-023) is a carbapenem β-lactam antibiotic.
