= Panipenem/betamipron =

Combination drug

Combination of
- Panipenem: Carbapenem antibiotic
- Betamipron: Inhibitor of renal panipenem uptake

Clinical data
- Trade names: Carbenin
- AHFS/Drugs.com: International Drug Names
- Routes of administration: Intravenous
- ATC code: J01DH55 (WHO)

Identifiers
- CAS Number: 138240-65-0
- PubChem CID: 115235
- KEGG: D02509

Panipenem/betamipron is a carbapenem antibiotic marketed by Daiichi Sankyo Co. of Japan. It was launched in 1993, under the brand name Carbenin.

It is a combination in which panipenem is the carbapenem antibiotic and betamipron inhibits renal uptake of panipenem and so reduces its nephrotoxicity (much like the imipenem/cilastatin combination).
