= Lenapenem =

Chemical compound

Clinical data
- Other names: BO-2727

Identifiers
- IUPAC name: (4R,5S,6S)-6-[(1R)-1-Hydroxyethyl]-3-[(3S,5S)-5-[(1R)-1-hydroxy-3-(methylamino)propyl]pyrrolidin-3-yl]sulfanyl-4-methyl-7-oxo-1-azabicyclo[3.2.0]hept-2-ene-2-carboxylic acid
- CAS Number: 149951-16-6
- PubChem CID: 216262
- ChemSpider: 187460
- UNII: D6NBQ3H12U
- CompTox Dashboard (EPA): DTXSID701031259

Chemical and physical data
- Formula: C_{18}H_{29}N_{3}O_{5}S
- Molar mass: 399.51 g·mol^{−1}
- 3D model (JSmol): Interactive image
- SMILES: C[C@@H]1[C@@H]2[C@H](C(=O)N2C(=C1S[C@H]3C[C@H](NC3)[C@@H](CCNC)O)C(=O)O)[C@@H](C)O

Lenapenem is a carbapenem antibiotic.
