= Betamipron =

Chemical compound

Clinical data
- AHFS/Drugs.com: International Drug Names
- ATC code: J01DH55 (WHO) (with panipenem)

Identifiers
- IUPAC name: 3-(benzoylamino)propanoic acid
- CAS Number: 3440-28-6
- PubChem CID: 71651
- ChemSpider: 64711
- UNII: 3W0M245736
- ChEMBL: ChEMBL1231530
- CompTox Dashboard (EPA): DTXSID0045626

Chemical and physical data
- Formula: C_{10}H_{11}NO_{3}
- Molar mass: 193.202 g·mol^{−1}
- 3D model (JSmol): Interactive image
- Melting point: 120 °C (248 °F)
- SMILES: O=C(NCCC(=O)O)c1ccccc1
- InChI: InChI=1S/C10H11NO3/c12-9(13)6-7-11-10(14)8-4-2-1-3-5-8/h1-5H,6-7H2,(H,11,14)(H,12,13); Key:CWXYHOHYCJXYFQ-UHFFFAOYSA-N

Betamipron (INN) or N-benzoyl-β-alanine is a chemical adjunct which is used together with panipenem in the formulation sold as Carbenin to inhibit panipenem uptake into the renal tubule and prevent nephrotoxicity. Alone it has no antibacterial function.

== See also ==
- Panipenem/betamipron
