= Sulopenem =

Chemical compound

- Skeletal structure of sulopenem

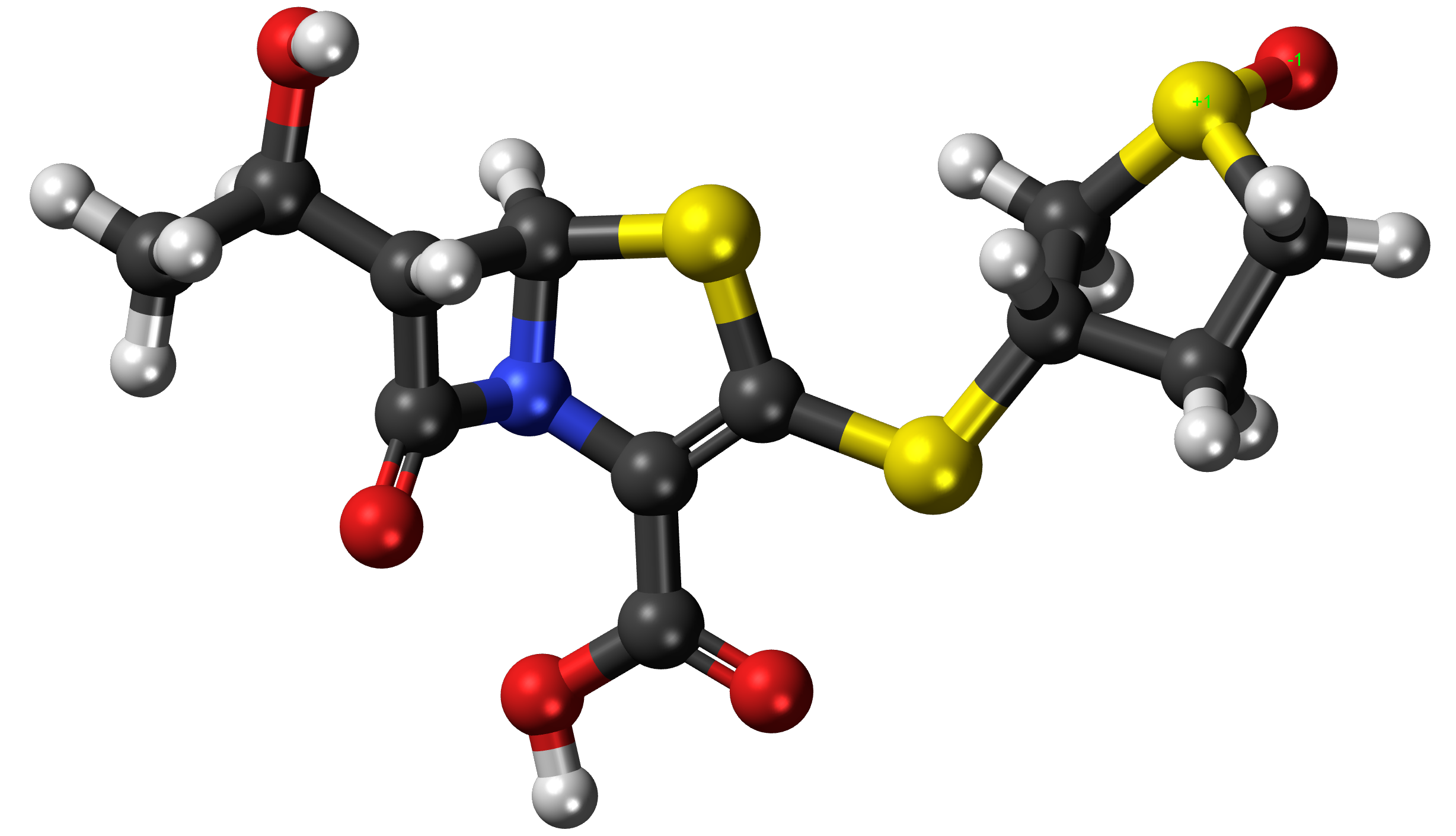
- Ball-and-stick model of sulopenem

Clinical data
- ATC code: None

Identifiers
- IUPAC name: (5R,6S)-6-[(1R)-1-Hydroxyethyl]-7-oxo-3-[(1R,3S)-1-oxothiolan-3-yl]sulfanyl-4-thia-1-azabicyclo[3.2.0]hept-2-ene-2-carboxylic acid
- CAS Number: 120788-07-0
- PubChem CID: 9950244
- DrugBank: DB15284
- ChemSpider: 8125855
- UNII: XX514BJ1XW
- KEGG: D05969
- CompTox Dashboard (EPA): DTXSID20869656

Chemical and physical data
- Formula: C_{12}H_{15}NO_{5}S_{3}
- Molar mass: 349.43 g·mol^{−1}
- 3D model (JSmol): Interactive image
- SMILES: C[C@H]([C@@H]1[C@@H]2N(C1=O)C(=C(S2)S[C@H]3CC[S@@](=O)C3)C(=O)O)O
- InChI: InChI=1S/C12H15NO5S3/c1-5(14)7-9(15)13-8(11(16)17)12(20-10(7)13)19-6-2-3-21(18)4-6/h5-7,10,14H,2-4H2,1H3,(H,16,17)/t5-,6+,7+,10-,21-/m1/s1; Key:FLSUCZWOEMTFAQ-PRBGKLEPSA-N

Sulopenem (CP-70,429) is a thiopenem antibiotic derivative from the penem family which is orally active. It was developed in Japan in the 1990s, and has been approved to treat uncomplicated urinary tract infections in combination with probenecid (brand name Orlynvah). It has reached phase III clinical trials on several occasions and is the subject of ongoing research into potential applications, especially in the treatment of multiple drug resistant urinary tract infections.

In October 2024, the US Food and Drug Administration approved sulopenem etzadroxil with probenecid combination for the treatment of urinary tract infections caused by Escherichia coli, Klebsiella pneumoniae, or Proteus mirabilis in adult women with limited alternative oral antibiotic options.
