= Membrane dipeptidase =

Identifiers
- EC no.: 3.4.13.19
- CAS no.: 9031-99-6

Databases
- IntEnz: IntEnz view
- BRENDA: BRENDA entry
- ExPASy: NiceZyme view
- KEGG: KEGG entry
- MetaCyc: metabolic pathway
- PRIAM: profile
- PDB structures: RCSB PDB PDBe PDBsum
Search
- PMC: articles
- PubMed: articles
- NCBI: proteins

Membrane dipeptidase (EC 3.4.13.19, renal dipeptidase, dehydropeptidase I (DPH I), dipeptidase, aminodipeptidase, dipeptide hydrolase, dipeptidyl hydrolase, nonspecific dipeptidase, glycosyl-phosphatidylinositol-anchored renal dipeptidase, MBD, MDP, leukotriene D_{4} hydrolase) is an enzyme. This enzyme catalyses the following chemical reaction

Hydrolysis of dipeptides (e.g., leukotriene D_{4}, cystinyl-bis-glycine, some β-lactam antibiotics (e.g., carbapenem))

This membrane-bound, zinc enzyme has broad specificity.

Inhibitors include bestatin and cilastatin.

== Genes ==
- Dipeptidase 1 (DPEP1)
- Dipeptidase 2 (DPEP2)
- Dipeptidase 3 (DPEP3)
