= Bronchopneumonia =

Lung disease

- Other names: Bronchial pneumonia, bronchogenic pneumonia
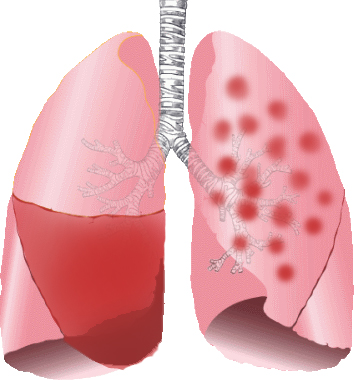
- Typical distribution of lobar pneumonia (left in image) and bronchopneumonia (right in image)
- Specialty: Pulmonology, infectious disease

Bronchopneumonia is a subtype of pneumonia. It is the acute inflammation of the bronchi, accompanied by inflamed patches in the nearby lobules of the lungs.

It is often contrasted with lobar pneumonia; but, in clinical practice, the types are difficult to apply, as the patterns usually overlap. Bronchopneumonia (lobular) often leads to lobar pneumonia as the infection progresses. The same organism may cause one type of pneumonia in one patient, and another in a different patient.

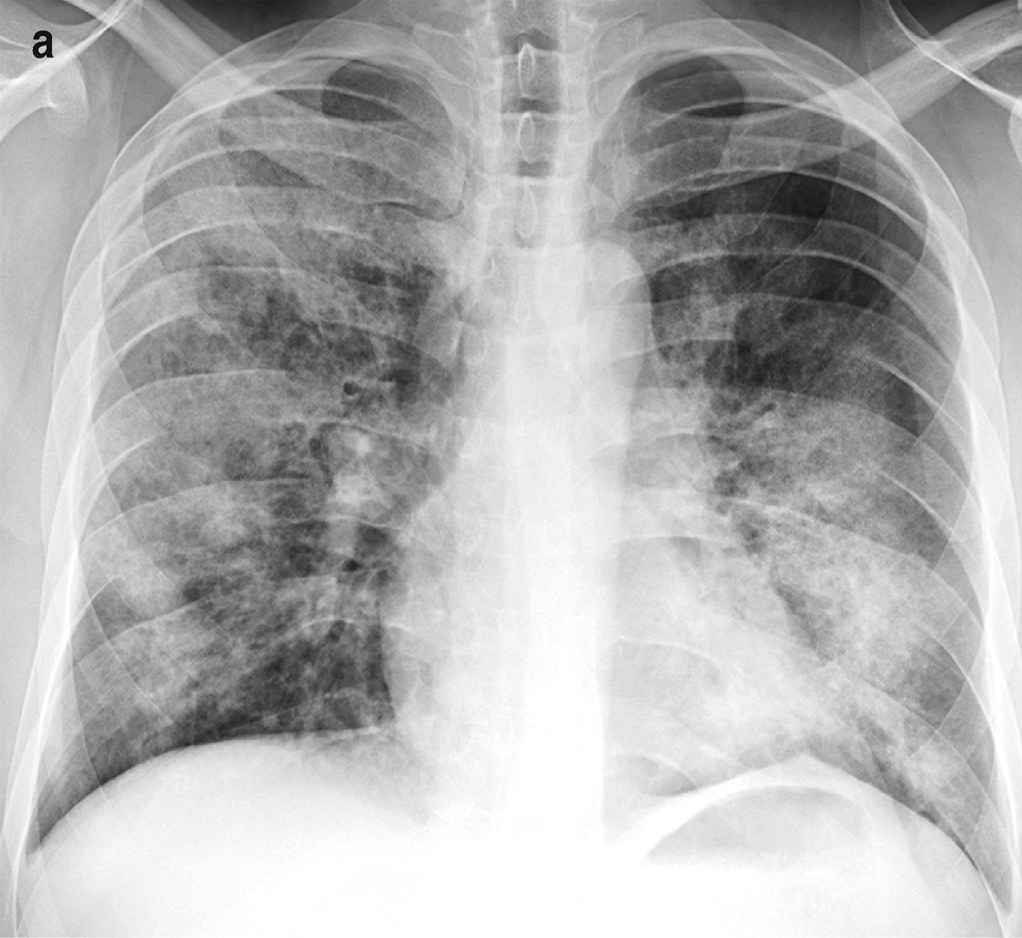
X-ray of bronchopneumonia: multifocal lung consolidation bilaterally.

== Causes ==
It is more commonly a hospital-acquired pneumonia than a community-acquired pneumonia, in contrast to lobar pneumonia.

Bronchopneumonia is less likely than lobar pneumonia to be associated with Streptococcus pneumoniae. Rather, the bronchopneumonia pattern has been associated mainly with the following: Staphylococcus aureus, Klebsiella, E. coli and Pseudomonas.

== Pathology ==
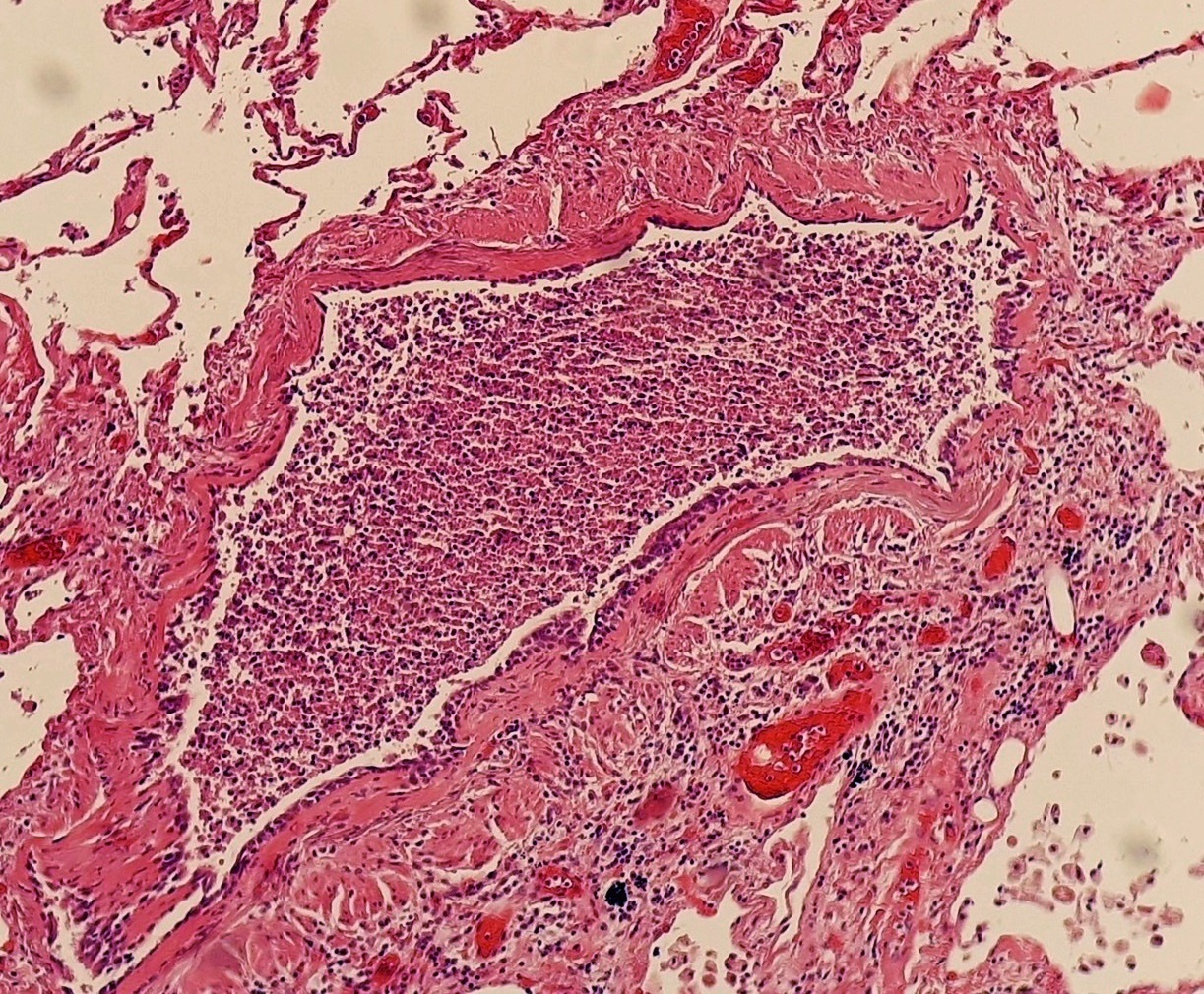
Histopathology of bronchopneumonia, showing neutrophils filling a bronchiole.

Bronchopneumonia may sometimes be diagnosed after death, during autopsy.

On gross pathology there are typically multiple foci of consolidation present in the basal lobes of the human lung, often bilateral. These lesions are 2–4 cm in diameter, grey-yellow, dry, often centered on a bronchiole, poorly delimited, and with the tendency to confluence, especially in children.

Light microscopy typically shows neutrophils in bronchi, bronchioles and adjacent alveolar spaces.

== Symptoms ==
Common symptoms include cough (often with mucus), chest pain, fever, headache (lack of oxygen), wheezing, chills, shortness of breath and body aches.

== Treatment ==
Compared to pneumonia in general, the association between the bronchopneumonia pattern and hospital-acquired pneumonia warrants greater consideration of multiple drug resistance in the choice of antibiotics.
