= Panipenem =

Chemical compound

Clinical data
- AHFS/Drugs.com: International Drug Names
- ATC code: J01DH55 (WHO) (with betamipron)

Identifiers
- IUPAC name: (5R,6S)-3-{[(3S)-1-ethanimidoylpyrrolidin-3-yl]sulfanyl}- 6-[(1R)-1-hydroxyethyl]-7-oxo-1-azabicyclo[3.2.0]hept-2-ene- 2-carboxylic acid
- CAS Number: 87726-17-8
- PubChem CID: 72015
- ChemSpider: 16736434
- UNII: W9769W09JF
- KEGG: D01048
- ChEMBL: ChEMBL339323
- CompTox Dashboard (EPA): DTXSID20868982

Chemical and physical data
- Formula: C_{15}H_{21}N_{3}O_{4}S
- Molar mass: 339.41 g·mol^{−1}
- 3D model (JSmol): Interactive image
- SMILES: C[C@H]([C@@H]1[C@H]2CC(=C(N2C1=O)C(=O)O)S[C@H]3CCN(C3)C(=N)C)O
- InChI: InChI=1S/C15H21N3O4S/c1-7(19)12-10-5-11(13(15(21)22)18(10)14(12)20)23-9-3-4-17(6-9)8(2)16/h7,9-10,12,16,19H,3-6H2,1-2H3,(H,21,22)/t7-,9+,10-,12-/m1/s1; Key:TYMABNNERDVXID-DLYFRVTGSA-N

Panipenem (INN) is a carbapenem antibiotic used in combination with betamipron. It is not used in the United States.

== See also ==
- Panipenem/betamipron
