= Thienamycin =

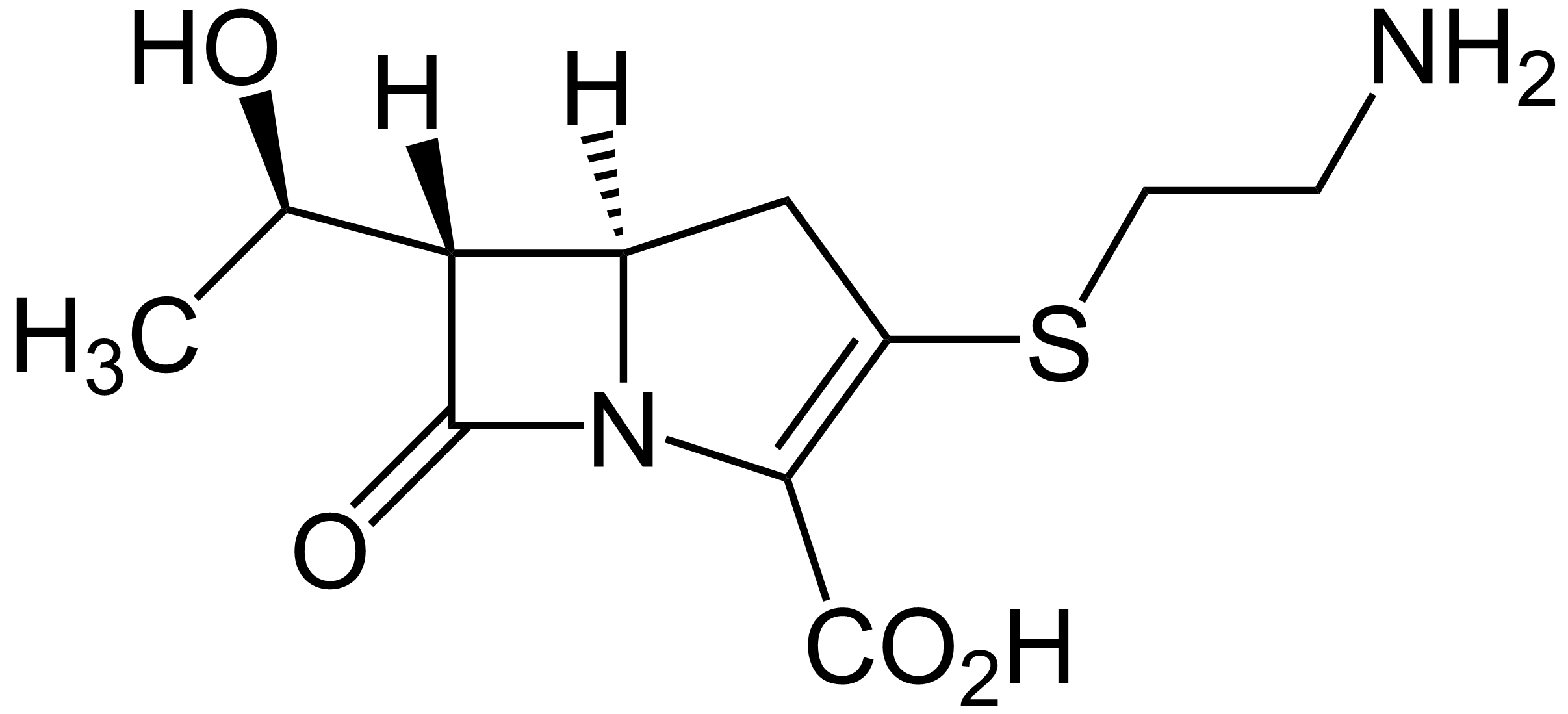

Names
- Preferred IUPAC name (5R,6S)-3-[(2-Aminoethyl)sulfanyl]-6-[(1R)-1-hydroxyethyl]-7-oxo-1-azabicyclo[3.2.0]hept-2-ene-2-carboxylic acid

Identifiers
| CAS Number | 59995-64-1 |
| 3D model (JSmol) | Interactive image |
| ChEMBL | ChEMBL278773 |
| ChemSpider | 389922 |
| PubChem CID | 441128 |
| UNII | WMW5I5964P |
| CompTox Dashboard (EPA) | DTXSID10975412 |
- InChI: InChI=1S/C11H16N2O4S/c1-5(14)8-6-4-7(18-3-2-12)9(11(16)17)13(6)10(8)15/h5-6,8,14H,2-4,12H2,1H3,(H,16,17)/t5-,6-,8-/m1/s1 Key: WKDDRNSBRWANNC-ATRFCDNQSA-N; InChI=1/C11H16N2O4S/c1-5(14)8-6-4-7(18-3-2-12)9(11(16)17)13(6)10(8)15/h5-6,8,14H,2-4,12H2,1H3,(H,16,17)/t5-,6-,8-/m1/s1 Key: WKDDRNSBRWANNC-ATRFCDNQBH
- SMILES: O=C(O)/C1=C(\SCCN)C[C@H]2N1C(=O)[C@@H]2[C@H](O)C

Properties
| Chemical formula | C_{11}H_{16}N_{2}O_{4}S |
| Molar mass | 272.32 g/mol |
- Except where otherwise noted, data are given for materials in their standard state (at 25 °C [77 °F], 100 kPa). verify (what is ?) Infobox references

Thienamycin (also known as thienpenem) is one of the most potent naturally produced antibiotics known thus far, discovered in Streptomyces cattleya in 1976. Thienamycin has excellent activity against both Gram-positive and Gram-negative bacteria and is resistant to bacterial β-lactamase enzymes. Thienamycin is a zwitterion at pH 7.

== History ==
In 1976, fermentation broths obtained from the soil bacterium Streptomyces cattleya were found to be active in a screen for inhibitors of peptidoglycan biosynthesis. Initial attempts to isolate the active compound proved difficult due to its chemical instability. After many attempts and extensive purification, the material was finally isolated in >90% purity, allowing for the structural elucidation of thienamycin in 1979.

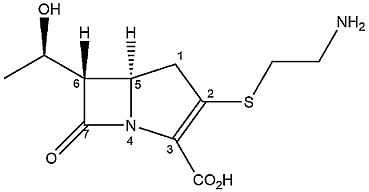
The structure of thienamycin with systematic numbering

Thienamycin was the first among the naturally occurring class of carbapenem antibiotics to be discovered and isolated. Carbapenems are similar in structure to their antibiotic “cousins” the penicillins. Like penicillins, carbapenems contain a β-lactam ring (cyclic amide) fused to a five-membered ring. Carbapenems differ in structure from penicillins in that within the five-membered ring a sulfur is replaced by a carbon atom (C1) and an unsaturation is present between C2 and C3 in the five-membered ring.

== Mechanism of action ==
In vitro, thienamycin employs a similar mode of action as penicillins through disrupting the cell wall synthesis (peptidoglycan biosynthesis) of various Gram-positive and Gram-negative bacteria (Staphylococcus aureus, Staphylococcus epidermidis, Pseudomonas aeruginosa to name a few). Although thienamycin binds to all of the penicillin-binding proteins (PBPs) in Escherichia coli, it preferentially binds to PBP-1 and PBP-2, which are both associated with the elongation of the cell wall.

Unlike penicillins, which are rendered ineffective through rapid hydrolysis by the β-lactamase enzyme present in some strains of bacteria, thienamycin remains antimicrobially active. Thienamycin displayed high activity against bacteria that were resistant to other β-lactamase-stable compounds (cephalosporins), highlighting the superiority of thienamycin as an antibiotic among β-lactams.

== Biosynthesis ==
The formation of thienamycin is thought to occur through a different pathway from classic β-lactams (penicillins, cephalosporins). Production of classic β-lactams in both fungi and bacteria occur through two steps: First, the condensation of l-cysteine, l-valine, and l-α-aminoadipic acid by ACV synthetase (ACVS, a nonribosomal peptide synthetase) and then cyclization of this formed tripeptide by isopenicillin N synthetase (IPNS).

The gene cluster (thn) for the biosynthesis of thienamycin of S. cattleya was identified and sequenced in 2003, lending insight into the biosynthetic mechanism for thienamycin formation. The biosynthesis is thought to share features with the biosynthesis of the simple carbapenems, beginning with the condensation of malonyl-CoA with glutamate-5-semialdehyde to form the pyrroline ring. The β-lactam is then formed by a β-lactam synthetase, which makes use of ATP, providing a carbapenam. At some later point, oxidation to the carbapenem and ring inversions must occur.

The hydroxyethyl side chain of thienamycin is thought to be a result of two separate methyl transfers from S-adenosyl methionine. According to the proposed gene functions, ThnK, ThnL, and ThnP could catalyze these methyl-transfer steps. A β-lactam synthetase (ThnM) is thought to catalyze the formation of the β-lactam ring fused to the five-membered ring. How the cysteaminyl side-chain is incorporated is largely unknown, although ThnT, ThnR, and ThnH are involved in the processing of CoA to cysteamine for use in the pathway. Various oxidations complete the biosynthesis.

== Total synthesis ==
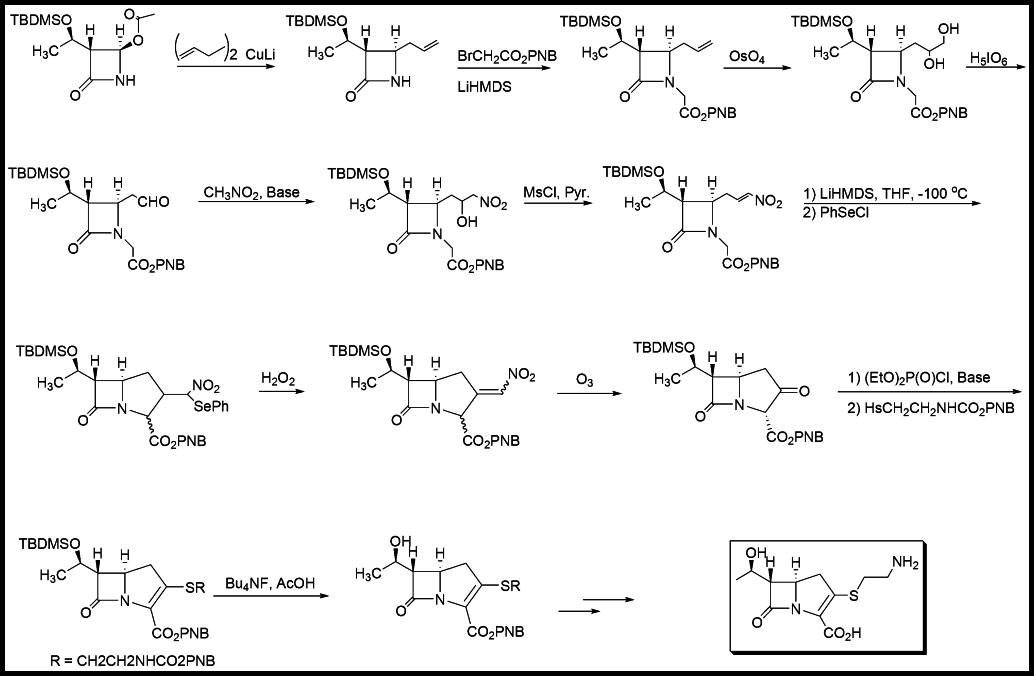
Figure 3. Total Synthesis of (+)-Thienamycin

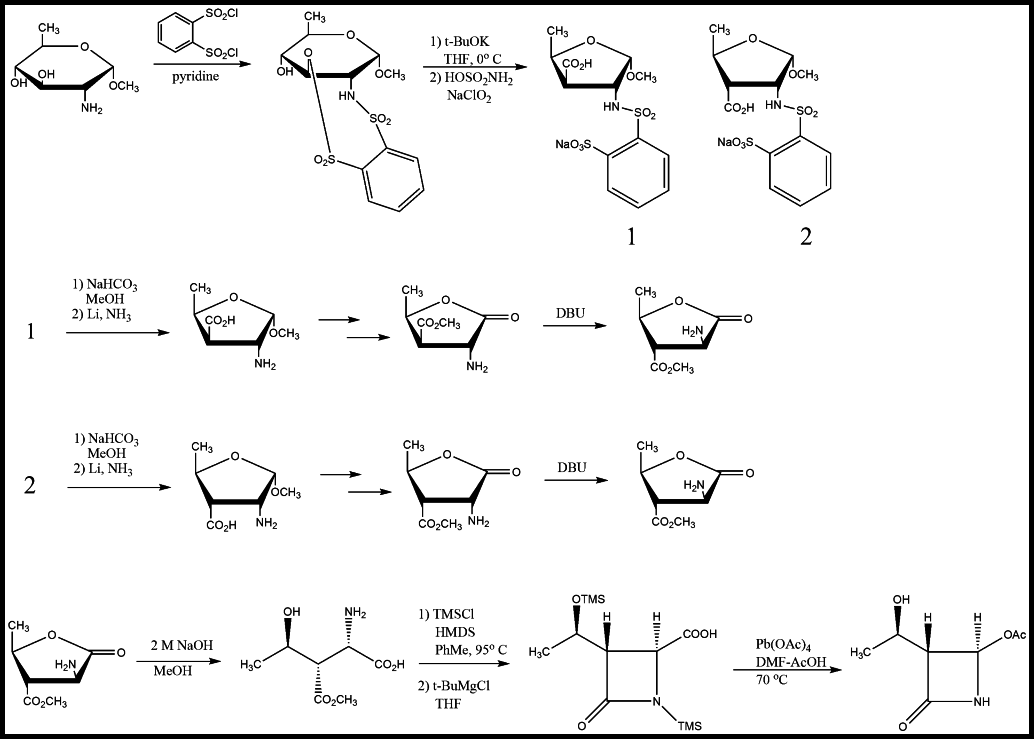
Figure 4. Stereoselective Formation of the Lactam Ring

Due to low titre and to difficulties in isolating and purifying thienamycin produced by fermentation, total synthesis is the preferred method for commercial production. Numerous methods are available in the literature for the total synthesis of thienamycin. One synthetic route is given in Figure 3.

The starting β-lactam for the pathway given above can be synthesized using the following method (Figure 4):

== Clinical use ==
Since thienamycin decomposes in the presence of water, it is impractical for the clinical treatment of bacterial infections, so stable derivatives were created for medicinal consumption. One such derivative, imipenem, was formulated in 1985. Imipenem, an N-formimidoyl derivative of thienamycin, is rapidly metabolized by a renal dipeptidase enzyme found in the human body. To prevent its rapid degradation, imipenem is normally coadministered with cilastatin, an inhibitor of this enzyme.
