= Tebipenem pivoxil =

Chemical compound

- Tebipenem pivoxil

Clinical data
- Trade names: Orapenem, others
- Other names: Tebipenem pivoxil hydrobromide (USAN US)
- AHFS/Drugs.com: utebzi
- License data: US DailyMed: Tebipenem pivoxil
- Routes of administration: By mouth
- Drug class: Beta-lactam antibiotic
- ATC code: J01DH06 (WHO)

Legal status
- Legal status: US: ℞-only; JP: Rx-only

Identifiers
- IUPAC name: (4R,5S,6S)-(Pivaloyloxy)methyl 3-((1-(4,5-dihydrothiazol-2-yl)azetidin-3-yl)thio)-6-((R)-1-hydroxyethyl)-4-methyl-7-oxo-1-azabicyclo[3.2.0]hept-2-ene-2-carboxylate
- CAS Number: 161715-24-8
- PubChem CID: 9892071
- UNII: 95AK1A52I8; NT65DX774J
- KEGG: D09598
- ChEMBL: ChEMBL2107486
- PDB ligand: 1TE (PDBe, RCSB PDB)
- CompTox Dashboard (EPA): DTXSID00167228

Chemical and physical data
- Formula: C_{22}H_{31}N_{3}O_{6}S_{2}
- Molar mass: 497.63 g·mol^{−1}
- 3D model (JSmol): Interactive image
- SMILES: [H][C@]12N(C(C(OCOC(C(C)(C)C)=O)=O)=C(SC3CN(C4=NCCS4)C3)[C@@H]2C)C([C@@]1([C@H](O)C)[H])=O

Tebipenem pivoxil, sold under the brand name Orapenem among others, is a beta-lactam antibiotic medication used for the treatment of complicated urinary tract infections, including pyelonephritis. It is a broad-spectrum orally-administered antibiotic, from the carbapenem subgroup of beta-lactam antibiotics. It was developed as a novel drug to combat bacteria that had acquired antibiotic resistance to commonly used antibiotics. Tebipenem is the first carbapenem whose prodrug form is orally available.

The most common side effects include diarrhea, headache, nausea, abdominal pain, increased liver enzymes, and Clostridioides difficile infection.

== Medical uses ==
Tebipenem pivoxil is indicated for the treatment of complicated urinary tract infections, including pyelonephritis, caused by the following susceptible microorganisms: Escherichia coli, Klebsiella pneumoniae, Enterobacter cloacae species complex, Klebsiella oxytoca, and Enterococcus faecalis in adults who have limited or no alternative oral treatment options.

In Japan, tebipenem pivoxil is approved for the treatment of haemophilus infections and streptococcal infections.

== Side effects ==
The most common side effects include diarrhea, headache, nausea, abdominal pain, increased liver enzymes, and Clostridioides difficile infection.

== History ==
The efficacy of tebipenem pivoxil was evaluated in adults with cUTI, including pyelonephritis, in a global, randomized, double-blind, double-dummy, noninferiority trial (NCT06059846). In this trial, 1,690 hospitalized participants were randomly assigned to receive tebipenem pivoxil 600 mg orally every 6 hours or imipenem-cilastatin 500 mg intravenously every 6 hours for 7 to 10 days. A total of 929 participants were considered the “intent-to-treat” population.

== Society and culture ==
=== Legal status ===
Tebipenem pivoxil was approved for medical use in Japan in April 2009, and in the United States in June 2026.

=== Names ===
Tebipenem pivoxil is the international nonproprietary name.

Tebipenem pivoxil is sold under the brand names Orapenem and Utebzi.
