= Razupenem =

Chemical compound

Clinical data
- Trade names: PTZ-601
- Routes of administration: IV

Legal status
- Legal status: US: Investigational New Drug

Identifiers
- IUPAC name: (4R,5S,6S)-6-((R)-1-hydroxyethyl)-4-methyl-3-((4-((S)-5-methyl-2,5-dihydro-1H-pyrrol-3-yl)thiazol-2-yl)thio)-7-oxo-1-azabicyclo[3.2.0]hept-2-ene-2-carboxylic acid
- CAS Number: 426253-04-5
- ChemSpider: 9168406
- UNII: 26020H3Q1L
- KEGG: D09658
- CompTox Dashboard (EPA): DTXSID801045429

Chemical and physical data
- Formula: C_{18}H_{21}N_{3}O_{4}S_{2}
- Molar mass: 407.50 g·mol^{−1}
- 3D model (JSmol): Interactive image
- SMILES: [H][C@]12N(C(C(O)=O)=C(SC3=NC(C4=C[C@H](C)NC4)=CS3)[C@@H]2C)C([C@@]1([C@H](O)C)[H])=O
- InChI: InChI=1S/C18H21N3O4S2/c1-7-4-10(5-19-7)11-6-26-18(20-11)27-15-8(2)13-12(9(3)22)16(23)21(13)14(15)17(24)25/h4,6-9,12-13,19,22H,5H2,1-3H3,(H,24,25)/t7-,8+,9+,12+,13+/m0/s1; Key:XFGOMLIRJYURLQ-GOKYHWASSA-N

Razupenem (PTZ-601) is a broad spectrum injectable antibiotic, from the carbapenem subgroup of beta-lactam antibiotics. It was developed as a replacement drug to combat bacteria that had acquired antibiotic resistance to commonly used antibiotics. Razupenem performed well against a variety of bacterial strains, but further development is in doubt due to a high rate of side effects in Phase II clinical trials.
