= Carbapenem =

Class of highly effective antibiotic agents

Backbone structure of a carbapenem.

Carbapenems are a class of very effective antibiotic agents most commonly used for treatment of severe bacterial infections. This class of antibiotics is usually reserved for known or suspected multidrug-resistant (MDR) bacterial infections. Similar to penicillins and cephalosporins, carbapenems are members of the beta-lactam antibiotics drug class, which kill bacteria by binding to penicillin-binding proteins, thus inhibiting bacterial cell wall synthesis. However, these agents individually exhibit a broader spectrum of activity compared to most cephalosporins and penicillins.

Carbapenem antibiotics were originally developed at Merck & Co. from the carbapenem thienamycin, a naturally derived product of Streptomyces cattleya. Concern has arisen in recent years over increasing rates of resistance to carbapenems, as there are few therapeutic options for treating infections caused by carbapenem-resistant bacteria (such as Klebsiella pneumoniae and other carbapenem-resistant Enterobacteriaceae).

== Medical uses ==
=== Intra-abdominal infections ===
The carbapenem ertapenem is one of several first-line agents recommended by the Infectious Disease Society of America for the empiric treatment of community-acquired intra-abdominal infections of mild-to-moderate severity. Agents with anti-pseudomonal activity, including doripenem, imipenem, and meropenem, are not recommended in this population. Doripenem, imipenem, and meropenem are recommended for high-risk community-acquired abdominal infections and for abdominal infections that are hospital-acquired.

=== Complicated urinary tract infections ===
A 2015 systematic review found little evidence that would support the identification of a best antimicrobial regimen for complicated urinary tract infections, but identified three high-quality trials supporting high cure rates with doripenem, including in patients with levofloxacin-resistant E. coli infections.

=== Pneumonia ===
The carbapenems imipenem and meropenem are recommended by the American Thoracic Society and the Infectious Disease Society of America as one of several first-line therapy options for people with late-onset hospital-acquired or ventilator-associated pneumonia, especially when Pseudomonas, Acinetobacter, or extended spectrum beta-lactamase producing Enterobacteriaceae are suspected pathogens. Combination therapy, typically with an aminoglycoside, is recommended for Pseudomonas infections to avoid resistance development during treatment.

Carbapenems are less commonly used in the treatment of community-acquired pneumonia, as community-acquired strains of the most common responsible pathogens (Streptococcus pneumoniae, Haemophilus influenazae, atypical bacteria, and Enterobactericeace) are typically susceptible to narrower spectrum and/or orally administered agents such as fluoroquinolones, amoxicillin, or azithromycin. Imipenem and meropenem are useful in cases in which P. aeruginosa is a suspected pathogen.

=== Bloodstream infections ===
A 2015 meta analysis concluded that the anti-pseudomonal penicillin-beta lactamase inhibitor combination piperacillin-tazobactam gives results equivalent to treatment with a carbapenem in patients with sepsis. In 2015, the National Institute for Health and Care Excellence recommended piperacillin-tazobactam as first line therapy for the treatment of bloodstream infections in neutropenic cancer patients.

For bloodstream infections known to be due to extended spectrum beta-lactamase producing Enterobacteriaceace, carbapenems are superior to alternative treatments.

=== Spectrum of activity ===
Carbapenems exhibit broad spectrum activity against gram-negative bacteria and somewhat narrower activity against gram-positive bacteria. For empiric therapy (treatment of infections prior to identification of the responsible pathogen) they are often combined with a second drug having broader spectrum gram-positive activity.

==== Gram-negative pathogens ====
The spectrum of activity of the carbapenems imipenem, doripenem, and meropenem includes most Enterobacteriaceace species, including Escherichia coli, Klebsiella pneumoniae, Enterobacter cloacae, Citrobacter freundii, Proteus mirabilis, and Serratia marcescens. Activity is maintained against most strains of E. coli and K. pneumoniae that are resistant to cephalosporins due to the production of extended spectrum beta-lactamases. Imipenem, doripenem, and meropenem also exhibit good activity against most strains of Pseudomonas aeruginosa and Acinetobacter species. The observed activity against these pathogens is especially valued as they are intrinsically resistant to many other antibiotic classes.

==== Gram-positive pathogens ====
The spectrum of activity of the carbapenems against gram-positive bacteria is fairly broad, but not as exceptionally so as in the case of gram-negative bacteria. Good activity is seen against methicillin-sensitive strains of Staphylococcus species, but many other antibiotics provide coverage for such infections. Good activity is also observed for most Streptococcus species, including penicillin-resistant strains. Carbapenems are not highly active against methicillin-resistant Staphylococcus aureus or most enterococcal infections because carbapenems do not bind to the penicillin-binding protein used by these pathogens.

==== Other ====
Carbapenems generally exhibit good activity against anaerobes such as Bacteroides fragilis. Like other beta lactam antibiotics, they lack activity against atypical bacteria, which do not have a cell wall and are thus not affected by cell wall synthesis inhibitors.

== Contraindications ==
Carbapenems are contraindicated in patients with prior allergic reactions to beta lactam antibiotics. In addition, as the intramuscular formulations of ertapenem and imipenem are formulated with lidocaine, the intramuscular formulation of these two drugs are contraindicated in patients with prior adverse reactions to lidocaine. Furthermore, carbapenems are also contraindicated in patients who are taking valproic acid for seizures, as it has been shown to decrease valproic acid concentrations by as much as 90%.

== Adverse effects ==
Serious and occasionally fatal allergic reactions can occur in people treated with carbapenems. Seizures are a dose-limiting toxicity for both imipenem and meropenem. Clostridioides difficile-related diarrhea may occur in people treated with carbapenems or other broad-spectrum antibiotics. Those with an allergy to penicillin may develop a cross sensitivity to carbapenems.

== Examples ==
=== Approved for clinical use ===
- Imipenem, the first clinically used carbapenem, was developed at Merck and Co. It was approved for use in the United States in 1985. Imipenem is hydrolyzed in the mammalian kidney by a dehydropeptidase enzyme to a nephrotoxic intermediate, and thus is co-formulated with the dehydropeptidase inhibitor cilastatin. Imipenem is available in both intravenous and intramuscular formulations.
- Meropenem is stable to mammalian dehydropeptidases and does not require co-administration of cilastatin. It was approved for use in the United States in 1996. In most indications it is somewhat more convenient to administer than imipenem, 3 times a day rather than 4. Doses of less than one gram may be administered as an IV bolus, whereas imipenem is usually administered as a 20-minute to one hour infusion. Meropenem is somewhat less potent than imipenem against gram-positive pathogens, and somewhat more potent against gram-negative infections. Unlike imipenem, which produced an unacceptable rate of seizures in a phase 2 trial, meropenem is effective for the treatment of bacterial meningitis. A systematic review performed by an employee of the company that markets meropenem concluded that it provides a higher bacterial response and lower adverse event rates than imipenem in people with severe infections, but no difference in mortality rate.
- Ertapenem is administered once daily as an intravenous infusion or intramuscular injection. It lacks useful activity against the P. aeruginosa and Acinetobacter species, both of which are important causes of hospital-acquired infections.
- Doripenem has a spectrum of activity very similar to that of meropenem. Its greater stability in solution allows the use of prolonged infusions and it is somewhat less likely to produce seizures than other carbapenems.
- Panipenem/betamipron (Japanese approval 1993)
- Biapenem (Japanese approval 2001) exhibits similar efficacy and adverse event rates as other carbapenems.
- Tebipenem pivoxil (Japanese approval 2015) is the first carbapenem whose prodrug form, the pivalyl ester, is orally available.

=== Unapproved/experimental ===
- Razupenem (PZ-601)
  - PZ-601 is a carbapenem antibiotic currently being tested as having a broad spectrum of activity including strains resistant to other carbapenems. Despite early Phase II promise, Novartis (who acquired PZ-601 in a merger deal with Protez Pharmaceuticals) recently dropped PZ-601, citing a high rate of adverse events in testing.
- Lenapenem
- Sulopenem is in clinical trials for drug resistant urinary tract infections
- Tomopenem
- Thienamycin (thienpenem) the first discovered carbapenem
- Faropenem

== Bacterial resistance ==
=== Enterobacteriaceae ===
Enterobacteriaceae are common pathogens responsible for urinary tract infections, abdominal infections, and hospital-acquired pneumonia. Beta lactam resistance in these pathogens is most commonly due to the expression of beta lactamase enzymes.

Between 2007 and 2011, the percentage of Escherichia coli isolates from Canadian hospitals that produce extended spectrum beta lactamases (ESBL) increased from 3.4% to 4.1%; among Klebsiella pneumoniae isolates ESBL producers increased from 1.5% to 4.0%. These strains are resistant to third generation cephalosporins that were developed for the treatment of beta lactamase-producing Enterobacteriaceae and carbapenems are generally regarded as the treatment of choice. More recently, many countries have experienced a dramatic upswing in the prevalence of Enterobacteriaceae that produce both ESBLs and carbapenemases such as the Klebsiella pneumoniae carbapenemase (KPC). As of 2013, 70% of Greek Klebsiella pneumoniae isolates are resistant to third generation cephalosporins and 60% are resistant to carbapenems. The growing prevalence and difficulty of treating such multi-drug resistant Enterobacteriaceae has led to a renaissance of the use of antibiotics such as colistin, which was discovered in the 1950s but rarely used until recently due to unattractive levels of toxicity.

Prevalence of carbapenem-resistant Enterobacteriaceae in paediatric intensive care units (Cairo, Egypt) was 24% and various genes of carbapenemases were detected in 80% of carbapenem-resistant Enterobacteriaceae with dominance of bla_{OXA-48.}

=== Pseudomonas aeruginosa and Acinetobacter baumannii ===
Infections caused by the non-fermenting gram-negative bacteria Pseudomonas aeruginosa and Acinetobacter baumanni are most commonly encountered in hospitalized people. These bacteria exhibit an unusually high level of intrinsic resistance to antibiotics due to their expression of a wide range of resistance mechanisms. Antibiotics cross the outer membrane of Pseudomonas and Acinetobacter approximately 100 times more slowly than they cross the outer membrane of Enterobacteriaceae, due in part to their use of porins that can adopt a conformation having a very restricted entry channel. Further, the porin levels may be down-regulated in response to antibiotic exposure. Antibiotic molecules that successfully traverse the porin channels may be removed by efflux pumps. Downregulation of the porin OprD2 is an important contributor to imipenem resistance.

Like the Enterobacteriaceae, Pseudomonas and Acinetobacter can express a wide range of antibiotic-deactivitating enzymes, including beta lactamases. Pseudomonas produces an inducible broad spectrum beta lactamase, AmpC, that is produced in response to beta lactam exposure. The combination of inducible AmpC expression, poor membrane permeability, and efflux pumps make Pseudomonas resistant to most beta lactams. The clinical efficacy of carbapenems in Pseudomonas infection arises in part because, while they are strong inducers of AmpC, they are poor substrates. The identification of Pseudomonas strains that produce beta lactamases capable of cleaving carbapenems, such as the New Delhi metallo beta lactamase has raised increasing concern regarding the potential for an era of untreatable Pseudomonas infections.

== Structure ==
Carbapenem (formula C_{6}H_{7}NO, registry number 63838–48–2) is the parent of this class of compounds. The parent is only of theoretical interest. The carbapenems are very similar to the penicillins (penams): the sulfur in penams is replaced with methylene and an unsaturation has been introduced—hence the name of the group, the carbapenems.

Carbapenems are further broken down into groups with ertapenem being the lone member of group 1. Group 2 carbapenems (imipenem, meropenem, and doripenem) are identified by their efficacy with respect to multiresistant gram-negative (MDRGN) bacteria such as Pseudomonas and Acinetobacter species.

== Biosynthesis ==
The carbapenems are thought to share their early biosynthetic steps in which the core ring system is formed. Malonyl-CoA is condensed with glutamate-5-semialdehyde with concurrent formation of the five-membered ring. Next, a β-lactam synthetase uses ATP to form the β-lactam and the saturated carbapenam core. Further oxidation and ring inversion provides the basic carbapenem.

== Administration ==
Due to their expanded spectra, the desire to avoid generation of resistance and the fact that, in general, they have poor oral bioavailability, they are administered intravenously in hospital settings for more serious infections. However, research is underway to develop an effective oral carbapenem.

== See also ==
- Faropenem is closely related, but it is a penem, not a carbapenem.
- Antimicrobial resistance
  - NDM-1 is an enzyme that introduces bacterial resistance to carbapenem antibiotics via hydrolysis of the carbapenem backbone, thereby inactivating its ability to inhibit cell wall synthesis.
