= Doripenem =

Antibiotic

Clinical data
- Trade names: Finibax, Doribax
- AHFS/Drugs.com: Monograph
- MedlinePlus: a608015
- License data: EU EMA: by INN; US FDA: Doripenem
- Pregnancy category: B
- Routes of administration: IM, IV
- ATC code: J01DH04 (WHO)

Legal status
- Legal status: US: ℞-only

Pharmacokinetic data
- Metabolism: Renal

Identifiers
- IUPAC name: (4R,5S,6S)-6-(1-Hydroxyethyl)-4-methyl-7-oxo-3-(((5S)-5-((sulfamoylamino)methyl)pyrrolidin-3-yl)thio)-1-azabicyclo[3.2.0]hept-2-ene-2-carboxylic acid
- CAS Number: 148016-81-3
- PubChem CID: 73303
- ChemSpider: 66040
- UNII: BHV525JOBH
- KEGG: D03895
- ChEMBL: ChEMBL491571
- CompTox Dashboard (EPA): DTXSID2046678

Chemical and physical data
- Formula: C_{15}H_{24}N_{4}O_{6}S_{2}
- Molar mass: 420.50 g·mol^{−1}
- 3D model (JSmol): Interactive image
- SMILES: O=S(=O)(N)NC[C@H]3NC[C@@H](S\C2=C(\N1C(=O)[C@H]([C@H](O)C)[C@H]1[C@H]2C)C(=O)O)C3
- InChI: InChI=1S/C15H24N4O6S2/c1-6-11-10(7(2)20)14(21)19(11)12(15(22)23)13(6)26-9-3-8(17-5-9)4-18-27(16,24)25/h6-11,17-18,20H,3-5H2,1-2H3,(H,22,23)(H2,16,24,25)/t6-,7-,8+,9+,10-,11-/m1/s1; Key:AVAACINZEOAHHE-VFZPANTDSA-N

Doripenem (Doribax, Finibax) is an antibiotic drug in the carbapenem class. It is a beta-lactam antibiotic drug able to kill Pseudomonas aeruginosa.

Doripenem can be used for bacterial infections such as: complex abdominal infections, pneumonia within the setting of a hospital, and complicated infections of the urinary tract including kidney infections with sepsis.

The greater stability of doripenem in aqueous solution compared to earlier members of the carbapenem class allows it to be administered as an infusion over 4 hours or more, which may be advantageous in the treatment of certain difficult-to-treat infections. It may present a lower risk of inducing seizures than other carbapenems.

== Chemistry and pharmacology ==
Doripenem is a beta-lactam antibiotic agent belonging to the carbapenem group, with a broad spectrum of bacterial sensitivity including both gram-positive and gram-negative bacteria. In vivo, doripenem inhibits the synthesis of cell walls by attaching itself to penicillin-binding proteins, also known as PBPs. However it is not active against MRSA. It is stable against beta-lactamases including those with extended spectrum, but it is susceptible to the action of carbapenemases. Doripenem is also more active against Pseudomonas aeruginosa than other carbapenems.

== Physicochemical properties ==
Doripenem appears as crystalline powder, with colour anywhere from a white to somewhat yellowish. Doripenem is moderately soluble in water, slightly soluble in methanol, and virtually insoluble in ethanol. Doripenem is also soluble in N,N-dimethylformamide. Doripenem's chemical configuration has 6 asymmetrical carbon atoms (6 stereocentres) and is most commonly supplied as one pure isomer. In terms of doripenem for injection, the crystallized powdered drug can form a monohydrate when mixed with water. However, doripenem has not been proven to possess polymorphism

== Adverse effects ==
- Seizure risk: carbapenems in general have been reported to cause seizure activity in some people. In addition, those who already have a seizure disorder may be at risk for further seizures if they are using valproic acid to control their seizures; doripenem has been found to decrease serum concentrations of valproic acid.
- Infection related: use of doripenem can lead to Clostridioides difficile infection. It has also been noted to increase mortality in people who have ventilator-associated bacterial pneumonia and is no longer recommended as a treatment for this condition.

== Resistance ==
Potential avenues for the development of resistance to doripenem are: altered PBPs (penicillin-binding protein), reduced activity in the permeability of the outer membrane especially when accepting foreign toxic substances within the cell, and deactivation of the drug by hydrolyzing enzymes from the carbapenem. Beta-lactamases (such as penicillinases) formed by gram-positive and gram-negative bacteria can stabilize doripenem to hydrolysis. However, carbapenem-hydrolyzing beta-lactamases are an exception.

== Pharmacokinetics ==
=== Distribution ===
On average, about 8.1% of plasma proteins attached to doripenem; it is separate from drug concentrations of plasma. Doripenem’s distribution volume is close to that of extracellular fluid volume in humans (18.2 L). When doripenem is essentially stable, the average volume of distribution is approximately 16.8 L. Within the few of the body’s fluids and tissues, Doripenem is filtered successfully as well as reaching concentration levels that are able to restrain from more vulnerable bacteria than what is required.

=== Metabolism ===
Doripenem is metabolized by the enzyme dehydropeptidase-I into an inactive ring-opened metabolite.

=== Excretion ===
In young and healthy adults, the elimination half-life of doripenem considering the average plasma terminal is normally around 1 hour. The plasma clearance is about 15.9 L/hour and the average renal clearance is 10.3 L/hour. Research indicates doripenem is filtered by the glomerular capillary bed in Bowman’s capsule and the tubular secretions in the nephron.

== Society and culture ==
=== Regulatory and marketing ===
It was launched by Shionogi Co. of Japan under the brand name in 2005 and is being marketed outside Japan by Johnson & Johnson. Doripenem was approved by the United States Food and Drug Administration on October 12, 2007, to be sold under the tradename Doribax. It has since been discontinued in the United States.
