= Faropenem =

Chemical compound

Clinical data
- AHFS/Drugs.com: International Drug Names
- Routes of administration: Oral
- ATC code: J01DI03 (WHO)

Identifiers
- CAS Number: 106560-14-9
- PubChem CID: 65894
- ChemSpider: 59303
- UNII: F52Y83BGH3
- ChEBI: CHEBI:51257
- ChEMBL: ChEMBL556262
- CompTox Dashboard (EPA): DTXSID0046430

Chemical and physical data
- Formula: C_{12}H_{15}NO_{5}S
- Molar mass: 285.31 g·mol^{−1}
- 3D model (JSmol): Interactive image
- SMILES: O=C2N1/C(=C(\S[C@@H]1[C@H]2[C@H](O)C)[C@@H]3OCCC3)C(=O)O
- InChI: InChI=1S/C12H15NO5S/c1-5(14)7-10(15)13-8(12(16)17)9(19-11(7)13)6-3-2-4-18-6/h5-7,11,14H,2-4H2,1H3,(H,16,17)/t5-,6-,7+,11-/m1/s1; Key:HGGAKXAHAYOLDJ-FHZUQPTBSA-N

Faropenem is an orally active beta-lactam antibiotic belonging to the penem group. It is resistant to some forms of extended-spectrum beta-lactamase. It is available for oral use.

== Forms ==
Faropenem was developed by Daiichi Asubio Pharma, which markets it in two forms.

- The sodium salt faropenem sodium, available under the trade name Farom, has been marketed in Japan since 1997. (CID 636379 from PubChem)
- The sodium salt faropenem sodium, available under the trade name Orfanem, has been marketed in Bangladesh by Incepta Pharmaceuticals Ltd.
- The prodrug form faropenem medoxomil (also known as faropenem daloxate) has been licensed from Daiichi Asubio Pharma by Replidyne, which plans to market it in conjunction with Forest Pharmaceuticals. The trade name proposed for the product was Orapem, but company officials recently announced this name was rejected by the FDA.

== Clinical use ==
As of 8 September 2015, Faropenem has yet to receive marketing approval in the United States, and was submitted for consideration by the United States Food and Drug Administration (FDA) on 20 December 2005. The new drug application dossier submitted included these proposed indications:

- acute bacterial sinusitis
- community-acquired pneumonia
- acute exacerbations of chronic bronchitis
- uncomplicated skin and skin structure infections
- urinary tract infections

== History ==
The FDA refused to approve faropenem, an antibiotic manufactured by Louisville-based Replidyne. The FDA said the drug was “nonapprovable”, but did not refer to specific safety concerns about the product. The company will have to conduct new studies and clinical trials, lasting an estimated two more years, to prove the drug treats community-acquired pneumonia, bacterial sinusitis, chronic bronchitis, and skin infections.

In India it is available under the name Farokaa, and in Bangladesh as Orfanem.
