= Dipeptidase 2 =

Mammalian protein found in Homo sapiens

DPEP2

Identifiers
- Aliases: DPEP2, MBD2, dipeptidase 2
- External IDs: OMIM: 609925; MGI: 2442042; GeneCards: DPEP2
Enzyme activity
EC #	BRENDA	ExPASy	KEGG	MetaCyc
3.4.13.19	↗	↗	↗	↗

Gene location (Human)
Chr.	Chromosome 16 (human)
Band	16q22.1	Start	67,987,394 bp
Band	16q22.1	End	68,000,586 bp
RNA expression pattern
Bgee	Human / Mouse (ortholog); Top expressed in: granulocyte; monocyte; blood; spleen; right lung; lymph node; bone marrow; upper lobe of left lung; testicle; appendix / n/a; More reference expression data
BioGPS	n/a
Gene ontology
Molecular function	peptidase activity; metalloexopeptidase activity; dipeptidyl-peptidase activity; metallopeptidase activity; hydrolase activity; metal ion binding; dipeptidase activity
Cellular component	anchored component of membrane; membrane
Biological process	proteolysis
Sources:Amigo / QuickGO
Orthologs
Databases	NCBI: entry; OMA: entry
Species	Human	Mouse
Entrez	64174	319446
Ensembl	ENSG00000167261	ENSMUSG00000053687
UniProt	Q9H4A9	Q8C255
RefSeq (mRNA)	NM_022355; NM_001324159; NM_001369657	NM_001301204; NM_001301205; NM_176913
RefSeq (protein)	NP_001311088; NP_071750; NP_001356586	NP_001288133; NP_001288134; NP_795887
Location (UCSC)	Chr 16: 67.99 – 68 Mb	n/a
PubMed search
- Wikidata
View/Edit Human	View/Edit Mouse

Dipeptidase 2 (DPEP2) is a protein which in humans is encoded by the DPEP2 gene.

DPEP2 belongs to the membrane-bound dipeptidase (EC 3.4.13.19) family. These enzymes hydrolyze a variety of dipeptides, including leukotriene D_{4}, the beta-lactam ring of some antibiotics, and cystinyl-bis-glycine (cys-bis-gly) formed during glutathione degradation.
