= Carbapenam =

Chemical compound

Names
- IUPAC name 1-Azabicyclo[3.2.0]heptan-7-one

Identifiers
CAS Number	23806-36-2; 73429-58-0 (R); 67506-08-5 (S)
3D model (JSmol)	Interactive image
ChemSpider	477976
PubChem CID	549337
UNII	3S6CW82TW8
CompTox Dashboard (EPA)	DTXSID10338487
- InChI: InChI=1S/C6H9NO/c8-6-4-5-2-1-3-7(5)6/h5H,1-4H2 Key: INAHHIFQCVEWPW-UHFFFAOYSA-N; InChI=1/C6H9NO/c8-6-4-5-2-1-3-7(5)6/h5H,1-4H2 Key: INAHHIFQCVEWPW-UHFFFAOYAR
- SMILES: O=C1N2C(C1)CCC2

Properties
Chemical formula	C_{6}H_{9}NO
Molar mass	111.144 g·mol^{−1}
- Except where otherwise noted, data are given for materials in their standard state (at 25 °C [77 °F], 100 kPa). Infobox references

A carbapenam is the parent member of the β-lactams compounds. The parent is of only of theoretical interest, but substituted derivatives are important carbapenem antibiotics, originally inspired by the structure of penicillin. In penicillin, the five-membered ring contains sulfur, whereas carbapenams have a CH_{2} in place of S. A related class of antibiotics are unsaturated carbapenems. Carbapenam-based antibiotics are widely used, but resistant strains of some pathogens have emerged.

Structure of (3S,5R)-carbapenam-3-carboxylic acid
