= Penem =

Class of antibiotics

A penem is a type of β-lactam with an unsaturated five-member heterocycle containing a sulfur atom in a pentacyclic ring fused to the β-lactam ring. Penems do not occur naturally; all are synthetic. Related to penems are carbapenems, which have a carbon atom in place of the sulfur atom.

An example is faropenem.

== Structure ==
Faropenem, a penem. A sulfur atom and a double bond are present in the pentacyclic ring.

Imipenem, a carbapenem. Imipenem has a sulfur atom that is not in the pentacyclic ring.

Benzylpenicillin, a penicillin. The double bond is absent in the pentacyclic ring.

Penem molecules do not occur naturally, and production of penems is an entirely synthetic process.

Five main penem subgroups — thiopenems, oxypenems, aminopenems, alkylpenems, and arylpenems — have been produced and are distinguished by the side chain (at position 2) of the unsaturated five-membered ring. One structurally distinct penem is BRL 42715. This molecule has no substitution at the above position, but has a bulky group attached to the β-lactam ring, and it displays effective inhibition of class C β-lactamases, but no antimicrobial activity.

One possible consequence of these structural differences of penems from other β-lactams may be reduced immunogenicity and immunogenic cross-reactivity.
