= Meropenem =

Broad-spectrum antibiotic

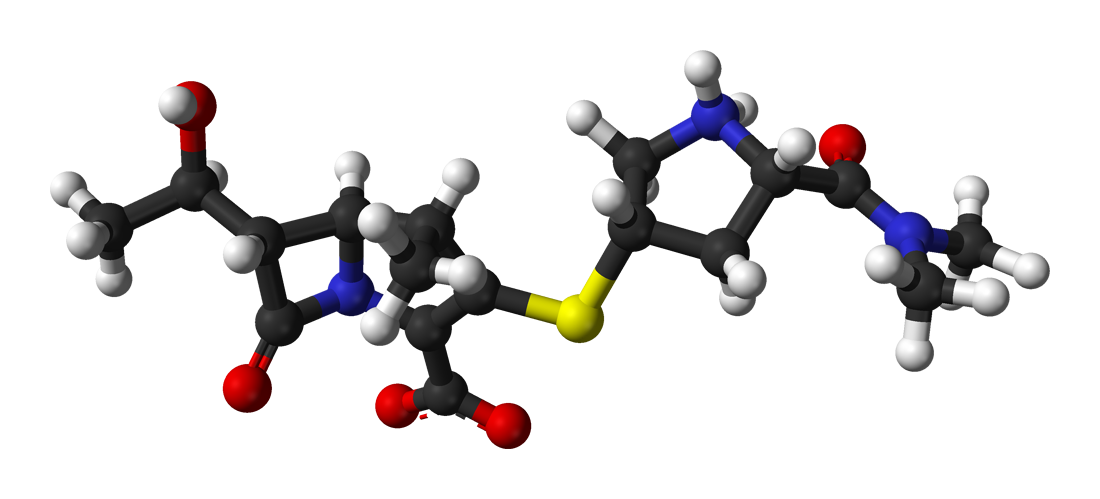

Clinical data
- Trade names: Merrem, others
- AHFS/Drugs.com: Monograph
- License data: US DailyMed: Meropenem
- Pregnancy category: AU: B2
- Routes of administration: Intravenous
- ATC code: J01DH02 (WHO)

Legal status
- Legal status: AU: S4 (Prescription only); CA: ℞-only; UK: POM (Prescription only); US: ℞-only

Pharmacokinetic data
- Bioavailability: 100%
- Protein binding: Approximately 2%
- Elimination half-life: 1 hour
- Excretion: Kidney

Identifiers
- IUPAC name: (4R,5S,6S)-3-(((3S,5S)-5-(Dimethylcarbamoyl)pyrrolidin-3-yl)thio)-6-((R)-1-hydroxyethyl)-4-methyl-7-oxo-1-azabicyclo[3.2.0]hept-2-ene-2-carboxylic acid
- CAS Number: 119478-56-7
- PubChem CID: 441130
- DrugBank: DB00760
- ChemSpider: 389924
- UNII: FV9J3JU8B1
- KEGG: D02222
- ChEBI: CHEBI:43968
- ChEMBL: ChEMBL127
- PDB ligand: MEM (PDBe, RCSB PDB)
- CompTox Dashboard (EPA): DTXSID7045526
- ECHA InfoCard: 100.169.299

Chemical and physical data
- Formula: C_{17}H_{25}N_{3}O_{5}S
- Molar mass: 383.46 g·mol^{−1}
- 3D model (JSmol): Interactive image
- SMILES: O=C3N2\C(=C(\S[C@H]1C[C@@H](C(=O)N(C)C)NC1)[C@H](C)[C@@H]2[C@H]3[C@H](O)C)C(=O)O
- InChI: InChI=1S/C17H25N3O5S/c1-7-12-11(8(2)21)16(23)20(12)13(17(24)25)14(7)26-9-5-10(18-6-9)15(22)19(3)4/h7-12,18,21H,5-6H2,1-4H3,(H,24,25)/t7-,8-,9+,10+,11-,12-/m1/s1; Key:DMJNNHOOLUXYBV-PQTSNVLCSA-N

Meropenem, sold under the brand name Merrem among others, is an intravenous carbapenem antibiotic used to treat a variety of bacterial infections. Some of these include meningitis, intra-abdominal infection, pneumonia, sepsis, and anthrax.

Common side effects include nausea, diarrhea, constipation, headache, rash, and pain at the site of injection. Serious side effects include Clostridioides difficile infection, seizures, and allergic reactions including anaphylaxis. Those who are allergic to other β-lactam antibiotics are more likely to be allergic to meropenem as well. Use in pregnancy appears to be safe. It is in the carbapenem family of medications. Meropenem usually results in bacterial death through blocking their ability to make a cell wall. It is resistant to breakdown by many kinds of β-lactamase enzymes, produced by bacteria to protect themselves from antibiotics.

Meropenem was patented in 1983. It was approved for medical use in the United States in 1996. It is on the World Health Organization's List of Essential Medicines. The World Health Organization classifies meropenem as critically important for human medicine.

== Medical uses ==
The spectrum of action includes many Gram-positive and Gram-negative bacteria (including Pseudomonas) and anaerobic bacteria. The overall spectrum is similar to that of imipenem, although meropenem is more active against Enterobacteriaceae and less active against Gram-positive bacteria. Meropenem is effective against bacteria producing extended-spectrum β-lactamases but may be more susceptible to hydrolysis by metallo-β-lactamases produced by bacteria. β-lactamases are enzymes that bacteria produce to hydrolyze β-lactam antibiotics, breaking the β-lactam ring and rendering these antibiotics ineffective. This mechanism helps bacteria resist the effects of antibiotics like penicillins, cephalosporins, and carbapenems, making treatment more challenging. While β-lactam ring in meropenem is more accessible to water molecules than in the other β-lactam antibiotics, that facilitates the hydrolysis process and faster degradation of meropenem's antibacterial properties in aqueous solutions, it is more resistant to degradation by β-lactamase enzymes produced by bacteria than the other β-lactam antibiotics.

Meropenem is frequently given in the treatment of febrile neutropenia. This condition frequently occurs in patients with hematological malignancies and cancer patients receiving anticancer drugs that suppress bone marrow formation. Meropenem is approved for complicated skin and skin structure infections, complicated intra-abdominal infections and bacterial meningitis.

Meropenem is effective in treating bacterial pneumonia, including hospital-acquired pneumonia.

In 2017, the U.S. Food and Drug Administration (FDA) granted approval for the combination of meropenem and vaborbactam to treat adults with complicated urinary tract infections.

== Administration ==
Meropenem is administered intravenously as an aqueous solution. Meropenem is stored in vials as white crystalline powder (containing meropenem as the trihydrate blended with anhydrous sodium carbonate). For intravenous administration, if pure meropenem powder is used (rather than the powder blended with sodium carbonate), meropenem is dissolved in 5% monobasic potassium phosphate solution, since meropenem is soluble in 5% monobasic potassium phosphate solution and only sparingly soluble in water (5.63 mg/mL). For intravenous bolus administration, injection vials (that contain meropenem blended with sodium carbonate) are reconstituted with sterile water for injection.

Reconstituted (dissolved) meropenem degrades over time. The degradation may be associated with color change of the solution, typical for a hydrolysis of the amide bond of the β-lactam ring as seen with most β-lactam antibiotics, while particularly for meropenem the color is changing from colorless or pale yellow to vivid yellowish. Upon reconstitution, the meropenem infusion solution, prepared with 0.9% sodium chloride, exhibits both chemical and physical stability for a duration of 3 hours at a temperature up to 25°C. If refrigerated (2–8°C), the stability extends to 24 hours. However, when the product is reconstituted in a 5% dextrose solution, it is used immediately to ensure its efficacy. The degradation of meropenem in a water-based solution is affected by factors such as pH, temperature, initial concentration, and the specific type of infusion solution used. Meropenem solutions should not be frozen.

Somewhat paradoxically, while meropenem is designed to resist bacterial enzymes, it can still be broken down by water. Specifically, the amide bond in the β-lactam ring of meropenem makes it resistant to many β-lactamases (penicillinases), which are bacterial enzymes that can break down penicillin and related antibiotics such as meropenem. Meropenem’s resistance is due to the stability of the β-lactam ring, which is less susceptible to hydrolysis by these enzymes. However, meropenem can undergo hydrolysis in aqueous solutions, which can reduce its effectiveness. Hence meropenem requires prolonged slow administration, or frequent re-administration, to continually replace what has been hydrolyzed by the water component of blood.

Meropenem is administered every 8 hours.

Dosing must be adjusted for altered kidney function and for haemofiltration.

Studies describe application of meropenem therapeutic drug monitoring (measurements of drug levels in the bloodstream at specific intervals) for optimal application.

As with other β-lactams antibiotics, the effectiveness of treatment depends on the amount of time during the dosing interval that the meropenem concentration is above the minimum inhibitory concentration for the bacteria causing the infection. For β-lactams, including meropenem, prolonged intravenous administration is associated with lower mortality compared to bolus intravenous infusion, especially in severe infections or those caused by less sensitive bacteria, such as Pseudomonas aeruginosa.

Meropenem exhibits poor permeability across the gut and low oral bioavailability because of its hydrophilic properties, which inhibit its passive diffusion across the intestinal epithelium. The challenges related to research of oral delivery of meropenem are related to high susceptibility of meropenem to degradation through hydrolysis of the amide bond in the β-lactam ring, even at relatively low temperatures and humidity. This instability can result in the loss of meropenem's antibacterial activity. Besides that, meropenem is unstable in the acidic environment of the stomach, leading to extensive degradation and loss of the drug after oral administration. In addition, intestinal efflux (secretory) transport can pump the drug back into the gut: efflux transporters, particularly P-glycoprotein (P-gp), present in the gastrointestinal tract can actively pump meropenem back into the gut lumen, limiting its absorption and reducing oral bioavailability; in the attempts of oral administration bacteria can develop resistance to meropenem by enhancing the active efflux of the antibiotic through efflux transporters, such as the MexAB-OprM tripartite efflux system in Pseudomonas aeruginosa. That's why meropenem is administered intravenously.

There is insufficient data regarding the administration of meropenem during breastfeeding. However, it has been observed that, in general, the concentration of this β-lactam antibiotic in breast milk is relatively low, therefore, β-lactam antibiotics are not anticipated to induce detrimental effects in infants who are breastfed. Nonetheless, there have been sporadic reports of disturbances in the gastrointestinal flora of the infant, manifesting as diarrhea or oral candidiasis (thrush), associated with the use of β-lactam antibiotics, however, these potential side effects have not been thoroughly investigated specifically in the context of meropenem use, therefore, the safety profile of meropenem in breastfeeding mothers and their infants is unknown.

Although meropenem is not approved for intramuscular or subcutaneous routes of administration in humans, there were studies that evaluated the drug bioavailability in cats and reported bioavailability of 99.69% for intramuscular route and 96.52 % for subcutaneous route of administration; these studies also compared elimination half-lives for intravenous, intramuscular or subcutaneous routes of administration in cats and reported duration of 1.35, 2.10 and 2.26 hours, respectively. There was also a small study on local tolerance of meropenem intramuscular administration in humans, and it was reported as generally good.

== Side effects ==
Among antibiotic drugs, meropenem is relatively safe. The most common adverse effects are diarrhea (4.8%), nausea and vomiting (3.6%), injection-site inflammation (2.4%), headache (2.3%), rash (1.9%) and thrombophlebitis (0.9%). Many of these adverse effects were observed in severely ill individuals already taking many medications including vancomycin. Meropenem has a reduced potential for seizures in comparison with imipenem. Several cases of severe hypokalemia have been reported.

== Interactions ==
Meropenem rapidly reduces serum concentrations of valproic acid. As a result, people who use valproic acid for epilepsy are at increased risk of seizures during treatment with meropenem. In situations where the use of meropenem cannot be avoided, prescription of an additional anticonvulsant should be considered.

== Pharmacology ==
=== Mechanism of action ===
Meropenem is bactericidal except against Listeria monocytogenes, where it is bacteriostatic. It inhibits bacterial cell wall synthesis like other β-lactam antibiotics. In contrast to other β-lactams, it is highly resistant to degradation by β-lactamases or cephalosporinases. In general, resistance arises due to mutations in penicillin-binding proteins, production of metallo-β-lactamases, or resistance to diffusion across the bacterial outer membrane. Unlike imipenem, it is stable to dehydropeptidase-1, so can be given without cilastatin.

In 2016, a synthetic peptide-conjugated PMO (PPMO) was found to inhibit the expression of New Delhi metallo-beta-lactamase 1, an enzyme that many drug-resistant bacteria use to destroy carbapenems.

=== Protein binding ===
Meropenem has a low protein binding rate of approximately 2%, in contrast to ertapenem, which is about 90%. This pharmacokinetic difference may impact clinical outcomes, particularly in hypoalbuminemic patients. Observational studies have shown that, in this population, treatment with meropenem is associated with a significantly lower 30-day mortality rate compared to ertapenem, with an approximately fourfold reduction in risk.

== Research directions ==
Nebulized meropenem (inhaled route) is researched, but is not approved, for prevention of bronchiectasis exacerbation.

== Society and culture ==
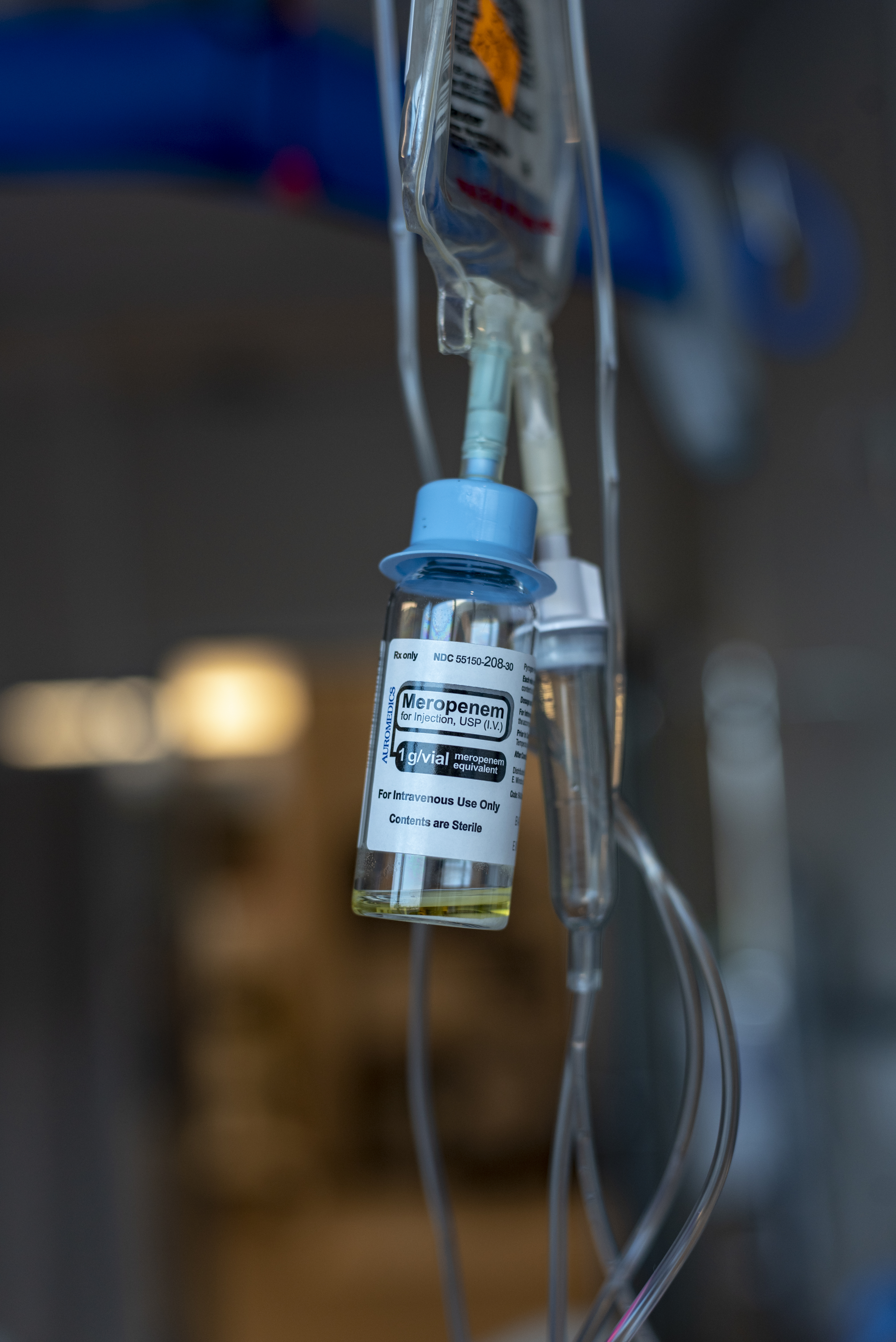
Meropenem vial

=== Trade names ===
Trade names
Country	Name	Maker
India	UNOMERO	Scutonix Lifesciences, Bombay
India	Inzapenum	Dream India
		Aurobindo Pharma
	Penmer	Biocon
	Meronir	Nirlife
	Merowin	Strides Acrolab
	Aktimer	Aktimas Biopharmaceuticals
	Neopenem	Neomed
	Mexopen	Samarth life sciences
	Meropenia	SYZA Health Sciences LLP
	Ivpenem	Medicorp Pharmaceuticals
	Merofit	
	Lykapiper	Lyka Labs
	Winmero	Parabolic Drugs
Bangladesh
	I-Penam	Incepta Pharmaceuticals Ltd.
	Meroject	Eskayef Pharmaceuticals Ltd.
	Merocon	Beacon Pharmaceuticals
Indonesia	Merofen	Kalbe Farma
Brazil	Zylpen	Aspen Pharma
Japan, Korea	Meropen	
Australia	Merem	
Taiwan	Mepem	
Germany	Meronem	
Nigeria	Zironem	Lyn-Edge Pharmaceuticals
Ukraine	Meropenem	Lekhim-Kharkiv
	Panlaktam (Panlaktam)	"Darnytsia"
	Mepenam	Kyivmedpreparat
	Merobicide	Borshchahiv HFZ
US	Meronem	AstraZeneca
Indonesia	Merosan	Sanbe Farma
Indonesia	Merobat	Interbat
	Zwipen	
	Carbonem	
	Ronem	Opsonin Pharma, BD
	Neopenem	
	Merocon	Continental
	Carnem	Laderly Biotech
	Penro	Bosch
	Meroza	German Remedies
	Merotrol	Lupin)
	Meromer	Orchid Chemicals
	Mepenox	BioChimico
	Meromax	Eurofarma
	Ropen	Macter
	mirage	adwic
	Meropex	Apex Pharma Ltd.
	Merostarkyl	Hefny Pharma Group
