= Imipenem =

Carbapenem antibiotic

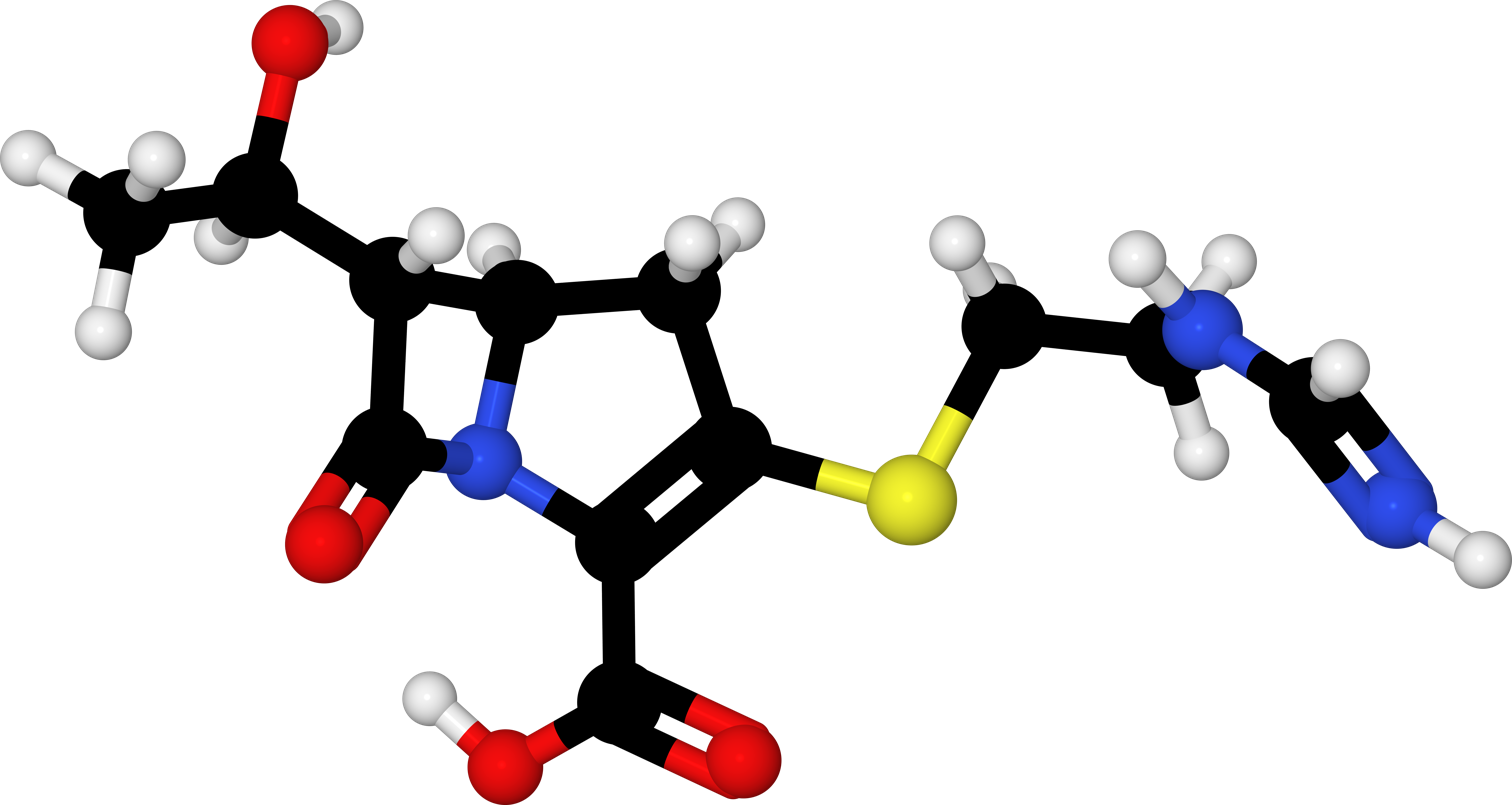

Clinical data
- Trade names: Primaxin, others
- AHFS/Drugs.com: International Drug Names
- MedlinePlus: a686013
- License data: US DailyMed: Imipenem
- Pregnancy category: AU: B3
- Routes of administration: Intramuscular, intravenous
- ATC code: J01DH51 (WHO)

Legal status
- Legal status: AU: S4 (Prescription only); CA: ℞-only; UK: POM (Prescription only); US: ℞-only

Pharmacokinetic data
- Protein binding: 20%
- Metabolism: Kidney
- Elimination half-life: 38 minutes (children), 60 minutes (adults)
- Excretion: Urine (70%)

Identifiers
- IUPAC name: (5R,6S)-6-[(1R)-1-hydroxyethyl]-3-({2-[(iminomethyl)amino]ethyl}thio)-7-oxo-1-azabicyclo[3.2.0]hept-2-ene-2-carboxylic acid
- CAS Number: 64221-86-9
- PubChem CID: 104838
- DrugBank: DB01598
- ChemSpider: 4445535
- UNII: Q20IM7HE75
- KEGG: D04515
- ChEBI: CHEBI:51799
- ChEMBL: ChEMBL43708
- PDB ligand: IM2 (PDBe, RCSB PDB)
- CompTox Dashboard (EPA): DTXSID2023143
- ECHA InfoCard: 100.058.831

Chemical and physical data
- Formula: C_{12}H_{17}N_{3}O_{4}S
- Molar mass: 299.35 g·mol^{−1}
- 3D model (JSmol): Interactive image
- SMILES: O=C(O)/C1=C(\SCC/N=C/N)C[C@H]2N1C(=O)[C@@H]2[C@H](O)C.O
- InChI: InChI=1S/C12H17N3O4S.H2O/c1-6(16)9-7-4-8(20-3-2-14-5-13)10(12(18)19)15(7)11(9)17;/h5-7,9,16H,2-4H2,1H3,(H2,13,14)(H,18,19);1H2/t6-,7-,9-;/m1./s1; Key:GSOSVVULSKVSLQ-JJVRHELESA-N

Imipenem, sold under the brand name Primaxin among others, is a synthetic β-lactam antibiotic belonging to the carbapenems chemical class, developed by Merck scientists Burton Christensen, William Leanza, and Kenneth Wildonger in the mid-1970s. Carbapenems are highly resistant to the β-lactamase enzymes produced by many multiple drug-resistant Gram-negative bacteria, thus playing a key role in the treatment of infections not readily treated with other antibiotics. It is usually administered through intravenous injection.

Imipenem was patented in 1975 and approved for medical use in 1985. It was developed via a lengthy trial-and-error search for a more stable version of the natural product thienamycin, which is produced by the bacterium Streptomyces cattleya. Thienamycin has antibacterial activity, but is unstable in aqueous solution, thus it is practically of no medicinal use. Imipenem has a broad spectrum of activity against aerobic and anaerobic, Gram-positive and Gram-negative bacteria.

Imipenem is a therapeutic alternative on the World Health Organization's List of Essential Medicines.

== Medical uses ==
=== Spectrum of bacterial susceptibility and resistance ===
Acinetobacter anitratus, Acinetobacter calcoaceticus, Actinomyces odontolyticus, Aeromonas hydrophila, Bacteroides distasonis, Bacteroides uniformis, and Clostridium perfringens are generally susceptible to imipenem, while Acinetobacter baumannii, some Acinetobacter spp., Bacteroides fragilis, and Enterococcus faecalis have developed resistance to imipenem to varying degrees. Not many species are resistant to imipenem except Pseudomonas aeruginosa (Oman) and Stenotrophomonas maltophilia.

=== Coadministration with cilastatin ===
Imipenem is rapidly degraded by the renal enzyme dehydropeptidase 1 when administered alone, and is almost always coadministered with cilastatin to prevent this inactivation.

== Adverse effects ==
Common adverse drug reactions are nausea and vomiting. People who are allergic to penicillin and other β-lactam antibiotics should take caution if taking imipenem, as cross-reactivity rates are high. At high doses, imipenem is seizurogenic.
