= Obicetrapib/ezetimibe =

Medication

Combination of
- Obicetrapib: Hypolipidemic agent
- Ezetimibe: Hypolipidemic agent

Clinical data
- Trade names: Evlarco
- Routes of administration: By mouth
- ATC code: None

Legal status
- Legal status: EU: Rx-only

Obicetrapib/ezetimibe, sold under the brand name Evlarco, is a fixed-dose combination medication used for the treatment of primary hypercholesterolemia (high cholesterol) or mixed dyslipidemia. It contains obicetrapib, as the salt obicetrapib hemicalcium, a lipid-modifying agent; and ezetimibe, a lipid-modifying agent. Obicetrapib blocks a blood protein called CETP thereby lowering the level of LDL cholesterol. Ezetimibe blocks a protein in the gut wall (NPC1L1) that absorbs cholesterol from food and bile, leading to decreased blood levels of LDL cholesterol. It is taken by mouth.

== Medical uses ==
Obicetrapib/ezetimibe is indicated in adults with primary hypercholesterolemia (heterozygous familial and non familial) or mixed dyslipidemia, as an adjunct to diet in combination with a statin in people unable to reach low density lipoprotein cholesterol (LDL C) goals with the maximum tolerated dose of a statin in addition to ezetimibe; or alone in people who are either statin intolerant or for whom a statin is contraindicated and are unable to reach LDL-C goals with ezetimibe alone; or in people already being treated with the combination of obicetrapib and ezetimibe as separate tablets with or without statin.

== Society and culture ==
=== Legal status ===
In July 2026, the Committee for Medicinal Products for Human Use of the European Medicines Agency adopted a positive opinion, recommending the granting of a marketing authorization for the medicinal product Evlarco, intended for the treatment of primary hypercholesterolemia (high cholesterol) or mixed dyslipidemia. The applicant for this medicinal product is A. Menarini International Licensing. Obicetrapib/ezetimibe was authorized for medical use in the European Union in September 2026.

=== Names ===
Obicetrapib/ezetimibe is sold under the brand name Evlarco.
