= Hyzetimibe =

Chemical compound

Clinical data
- Other names: HS-25

Legal status
- Legal status: In general: ℞ (Prescription only)

Identifiers
- IUPAC name: (3R,4S)-1-(4-Fluorophenyl)-3-((Z)-3-(4-fluorophenyl)-4-hydroxy-but-2-enyl)-4-(4-hydroxyphenyl)azetidin-2-one
- CAS Number: 1266548-74-6
- PubChem CID: 50923862
- ChemSpider: 68007168
- UNII: NUM111M552
- ChEMBL: ChEMBL4297389

Chemical and physical data
- Formula: C_{25}H_{21}F_{2}NO_{3}
- Molar mass: 421.444 g·mol^{−1}
- InChI: InChI=InChI=1S/C25H21F2NO3/c26-19-6-1-16(2-7-19)18(15-29)5-14-23-24(17-3-12-22(30)13-4-17)28(25(23)31)21-10-8-20(27)9-11-21/h1-13,23-24,29-30H,14-15H2/b18-5+/t23-,24-/m1/s1; Key:HEHHPZYUXSFAPV-SMOXZEHUSA-N

Hyzetimibe is a pharmaceutical drug that inhibits cholesterol absorption. It targets the NPC1-like intracellular cholesterol transporter 1.

It reduces plasma levels of low-density lipoprotein cholesterol (LDL-C) by blocking the Niemann-Pick C1-like 1 protein, a transporter mainly found in the intestine that allows dietary cholesterol to enter the body from the intestinal lumen.

In China, it is used as a lipid-lowering agent and it has efficacy similar to ezetimibe.
