= Bempedoic acid/ezetimibe/atorvastatin =

Bempedoic acid/ezetimibe/atorvastatin is a combination therapy composed of bempedoic acid, ezetimibe, and atorvastatin. In a randomized study it showed a LDL-C reduction of 63.6 percent, significantly more than bempedoic acid/ezetimibe, and it may also be more effective than bempedoic acid / statin combination therapy.
