= Evacetrapib =

Names
- IUPAC name Trans-4-({(5S)-5-[{[3,5-bis(trifluoromethyl)phenyl]methyl}(2-methyl-2H-tetrazol-5- yl)amino]-7,9-dimethyl-2,3,4,5-tetrahydro-1H-benzazepin-1-yl}methyl) cyclohexanecarboxylic acid
- Other names LY2484595

Identifiers
CAS Number	1186486-62-3
3D model (JSmol)	Interactive image
ChEMBL	ChEMBL2017179
ChemSpider	26286916
ECHA InfoCard	100.227.032
KEGG	D10121
PubChem CID	49836058
UNII	51XWV9K850
- InChI: InChI=1S/C31H36F6N6O2/c1-18-11-19(2)27-25(12-18)26(5-4-10-42(27)16-20-6-8-22(9-7-20)28(44)45)43(29-38-40-41(3)39-29)17-21-13-23(30(32,33)34)15-24(14-21)31(35,36)37/h11-15,20,22,26H,4-10,16-17H2,1-3H3,(H,44,45)/t20-,22-,26-/m0/s1 Key: IHIUGIVXARLYHP-YBXDKENTSA-N; InChI=1/C31H36F6N6O2/c1-18-11-19(2)27-25(12-18)26(5-4-10-42(27)16-20-6-8-22(9-7-20)28(44)45)43(29-38-40-41(3)39-29)17-21-13-23(30(32,33)34)15-24(14-21)31(35,36)37/h11-15,20,22,26H,4-10,16-17H2,1-3H3,(H,44,45)/t20-,22-,26-/m0/s1 Key: IHIUGIVXARLYHP-YBXDKENTBY
- SMILES: O=C([C@H]1CC[C@H](CN2CCC[C@H](N(CC3=CC(C(F)(F)F)=CC(C(F)(F)F)=C3)C4=NN(C)N=N4)C5=CC(C)=CC(C)=C52)CC1)O

Properties
Chemical formula	C_{31}H_{36}F_{6}N_{6}O_{2}
Molar mass	638.659 g·mol^{−1}
- Except where otherwise noted, data are given for materials in their standard state (at 25 °C [77 °F], 100 kPa). verify (what is ?) Infobox references

Evacetrapib was a drug under development by Eli Lilly and Company (investigational name LY2484595) that inhibits cholesterylester transfer protein (CETP inhibitor). CETP collects triglycerides from very low-density lipoproteins (VLDL) or low-density lipoproteins (LDL) and exchanges them for cholesteryl esters from high-density lipoproteins (HDL), and vice versa, but primarily increasing high-density lipoprotein and lowering low-density lipoprotein. It is thought that modifying lipoprotein levels modifies the risk of cardiovascular disease. The first CETP inhibitor, torcetrapib, was unsuccessful because it increased levels of the hormone aldosterone and increased blood pressure, which led to excess cardiac events when it was studied. Evacetrapib does not have the same effect. When studied in a small clinical trial in people with elevated LDL and low HDL, significant improvements were noted in their lipid profile.

Evacetrapib evaluation for treatment of high-risk vascular disease was discontinued due to lack of efficacy, as had already happened in the past with two other CETP inhibitors (torcetrapib and dalcetrapib) due to increased deaths and little identifiable cardiovascular benefit (despite substantial increases in HDL). Some hypothesize that CETP inhibitors may still be useful in the treatment of dyslipidemia, though significant caution is warranted. Anacetrapib is the fourth CETP inhibitor being tried for cardiovascular benefit

== Trials ==
=== ACCELERATE ===
In a 2014 study in 165 Japanese patients evacetrapib decreased CETP activity alone or in combination with atorvastatin.

Phase III trial was terminated due to futility. ACCELERATE studied evacetrapib in participants with high-risk vascular disease (previous myocardial infarction, stroke or peripheral vascular disease, or several cardiovascular risk factors). An interim analysis performed in October 7 led the Data Monitoring Committee to support a recommendation to stop the study as the totality of evidence suggested that evacetrapib was unlikely to be superior to placebo. ACCENTUATE is studying patients with hyperlipidemia or diabetes.

On April 3, 2016 at the American College of Cardiology cardiologists first saw the data for Eli Lilly's ACCELERATE trial of evacetrapib involving 12,000 patients. They were "stunned" by the result which showed there was no benefit from taking evacetrapib—434 participants who took evacetrapib died from "cardiovascular disease, such as a heart attack or a stroke" and 444 participants who took a placebo died. The ACCELERATE trial led by Stephen J. Nicholls who observed,

"“It’s the most mind-boggling question. How can a drug that lowers something that is associated with benefit not show any benefit?"

— Stephen J. Nicholls 2016
