= Mangotoxin =

Bacterial toxin

Mangotoxin is a phytotoxin produced by the bacterium Pseudomonas syringae that causes apical necrosis in mango plants and chlorosis in other plants. It disrupts plant metabolism by inhibiting ornithine acetyltransferase, an enzyme involved in ornithine and arginine biosynthesis. In disease, it also acts as a virulence factor by weakening plant defenses.

== Mbo operon ==
The proteins required for mangotoxin biosynthesis are encoded by the genes in mangotoxin biosynthetic operon (mbo), which were identified using random mini-Tn5 mutagenesis, and subsequent cloning, sequencing, and expression. The mbo operon consist of six genes: mboA, mboB, mboC, mboD, mboE, and mboF. All of them are required for the synthesis, and if any of these genes were disrupted, it could result in mangotoxin production deficiency. Other genes involved in the regulation of mangotoxin biosynthesis are the GacS/GacA genes and the mangotoxin generating operon (mgo). The MgoA protein increases expression of mbo, but lack of MgoA is not enough to silence the mbo. The GacS/GacA genes is highly conserved in Gram-negative bacteria, and controls pathogenicity, quorum sensing, secondary metabolite production, and biofilm formation. In Pseudomonas syringae, the GacS/GacA gene regulates the production of multiple phytotoxins like syringomycin, syringopeptin, tabtoxin, and phaseolotoxin.

== Mgo operon ==
The mgo operon consists of four genes: mgoB, mgoC, mgoA, and mgoD. Mutations in mgoC, mgoA, and mgoD have shown a lack of mangotoxin production, while a mutation in mgoB showed an alteration. These genes are predicted to encode for proteins for a haem oxygenase (mgoB), a p-aminobenzoate N-oxygenase (MgoC), a nonribosomal peptide synthetase (NRPs) (mgoA), and a polyketide cyclase/dehydrase or lipid transporter (MgoD). The mgo operon is a positive regulator of the mbo operon.

== Ornithine and arginine biosynthesis ==
In the biosynthesis of ornithine and arginine, mangotoxin specifically targets ornithine N-acetyltransferase (OAT), which is a key enzyme in the synthesis of ornithine and arginine. OAT catalyzes the transfer of the acetyl group from N-acetylornithine (NAO) to glutamate, producing N-acetylglutamate and ornithine. Mangotoxin acts as an antimetabolite inhibitor of OAT, leading to an accumulation of NAO and glutamate, causing a depletion of intracellular ornithine and arginine. In some bacteria, such as Enterobacteriaceae, NAO can be converted to orthithine by acetylornithine deacetylase (AO), that may also be inhibited by mangotoxin. Similarly, such inhibition can also be seen in p-chloromercuribenzoic acid (PCMB), a chemical inhibitor of OAT and AO. From Arrebola et al.'s findings, it can demonstrate that mangotoxin disrupts a certain step of the arginine biosynthesis pathway, specifically the OAT enzyme. However, mangotoxin's metabolic step differs from other Pseudomonas syringae toxins, such as tabtoxins, which inhibits glutamine synthetase (GS), or phaseolotoxin, which inhibits ornithine carbamoyltransferase (OCT).

The mangotoxin related genes and their homologues are common in Pseudomonas, and they also appear also in other phyla, like Burkholderia. Their purpose is to produce toxin to kill other competing microbes, like fungi or oomycetes.
