= SCH-48461 =

Names
- Preferred IUPAC name (3R,4S)-1,4-Bis(4-methoxyphenyl)-3-(3-phenylpropyl)azetidin-2-one

Identifiers
CAS Number	148260-92-8
3D model (JSmol)	Interactive image
ChEMBL	ChEMBL23541
ChemSpider	117230
PubChem CID	132832
UNII	T0H910M40A
CompTox Dashboard (EPA)	DTXSID50933354
- InChI: InChI=1S/C26H27NO3/c1-29-22-15-11-20(12-16-22)25-24(10-6-9-19-7-4-3-5-8-19)26(28)27(25)21-13-17-23(30-2)18-14-21/h3-5,7-8,11-18,24-25H,6,9-10H2,1-2H3/t24-,25-/m1/s1 Key: IMNTVVOUWFPRSB-JWQCQUIFSA-N; InChI=1/C26H27NO3/c1-29-22-15-11-20(12-16-22)25-24(10-6-9-19-7-4-3-5-8-19)26(28)27(25)21-13-17-23(30-2)18-14-21/h3-5,7-8,11-18,24-25H,6,9-10H2,1-2H3/t24-,25-/m1/s1 Key: IMNTVVOUWFPRSB-JWQCQUIFBU
- SMILES: COc1ccc(cc1)[C@@H]2[C@H](C(=O)N2c3ccc(cc3)OC)CCCc4ccccc4

Properties
Chemical formula	C_{26}H_{27}NO_{3}
Molar mass	401.49748
- Except where otherwise noted, data are given for materials in their standard state (at 25 °C [77 °F], 100 kPa). verify (what is ?) Infobox references

SCH-48461 is a cholesterol absorption inhibitor.

During the early phases of an NPC1L1 inhibitor discovery program at Schering-Plough, conformationally restricted analogs based on the 2-azetidinone backbone were targeted by Burnett and co-workers. Early in the biological evaluation, it became apparent that even though the in vitro ACAT inhibitory activity of these analogs was modest (e.g., IC_{50} values of 2–50 mM), they exhibited significant activity in a cholesterol-fed hamster model (CFH). The discovery of the prototypical 2-azetidinone CAI, SCH-48461 (ACAT IC_{50} ~26 mM, ED_{50} of CE reduction in hamsters ~2.2 mpk) and the details of the first-generation SAR have been described in detail.
