= C7H12N2O4 =

The molecular formula C_{7}H_{12}N_{2}O_{4} (molar mass: 188.183 g/mol) may refer to:

- Aceglutamide, or acetylglutamine
- DMDM hydantoin
- Tabtoxinine β-lactam
