= Isonocardicin synthase =

Class of enzymes

Identifiers
- EC no.: 2.5.1.38
- CAS no.: 118246-74-5

Databases
- IntEnz: IntEnz view
- BRENDA: BRENDA entry
- ExPASy: NiceZyme view
- KEGG: KEGG entry
- MetaCyc: metabolic pathway
- PRIAM: profile
- PDB structures: RCSB PDB PDBe PDBsum
- Gene Ontology: AmiGO / QuickGO
Search
- PMC: articles
- PubMed: articles
- NCBI: proteins

Isonocardicin synthase (EC 2.5.1.38) is an enzyme that catalyzes a chemical reaction which transfers the 3-amino-3-carboxypropyl group from its coenzyme, S-adenosyl methionine (SAM), giving 5'-methylthioadenosine as a byproduct. The enzyme from Nocardia uniformis can act on several natural beta lactams of the nocardicin type but the main reaction in the biosynthetic pathway leading to nocardicin A converts nocardicin G to isonocardicin C:

nocardicin G
+ SAM
isonocardicin C
+ 5′-methylthio
adenosine

This enzyme belongs to the family of transferases, specifically those transferring aryl or alkyl groups other than methyl groups. The systematic name of this enzyme class is S-adenosyl-L-methionine:nocardicin-E 3-amino-3-carboxypropyltransferase. This enzyme is also called nocardicin aminocarboxypropyltransferase.
