= Bempedoic acid/ezetimibe =

Combination drug

Combination of
- Bempedoic acid: Adenosine triphosphate-citrate lyase (ACL) inhibitor
- Ezetimibe: Cholesterol absorption inhibitor

Clinical data
- Trade names: Nexlizet, Nustendi
- AHFS/Drugs.com: Multum Consumer Information
- License data: US DailyMed: Bempedoic acid and ezetimibe
- Routes of administration: By mouth
- ATC code: C10BA10 (WHO)

Legal status
- Legal status: US: ℞-only; EU: Rx-only; In general: ℞ (Prescription only)

Identifiers
- KEGG: D11794

Bempedoic acid/ezetimibe, sold under the brand name Nexlizet among others, is a fixed-dose combination medication used for the treatment of high cholesterol. It is a combination of bempedoic acid and ezetimibe.

The most common side effects are hyperuricemia (high blood levels of uric acid) and constipation.

Bempedoic acid is an adenosine triphosphate-citrate lyase (ACL) inhibitor and ezetimibe is a cholesterol absorption inhibitor. Bempedoic acid works by blocking an enzyme in the liver called adenosine triphosphate citrate lyase, which is involved in making cholesterol. Ezetimibe works by binding to a gut protein called 'Niemann-Pick C1 Like 1', preventing cholesterol from being absorbed into the blood from the gut.

The combination was approved for medical use in the United States in February 2020, and in the European Union in March 2020.

== Medical uses ==
In the United States, bempedoic acid/ezetimibe is indicated as an adjunct to diet and maximally tolerated statin therapy for the treatment of adults with heterozygous familial hypercholesterolemia or established atherosclerotic cardiovascular disease who require additional lowering of LDL-C.

In the European Union, bempedoic acid/ezetimibe is indicated in adults with primary hypercholesterolemia (heterozygous familial and non-familial) or mixed dyslipidemia, as an adjunct to diet:

- in combination with a statin in people unable to reach LDL-C goals with the maximum tolerated dose of a statin in addition to ezetimibe
- alone in people who are either statin-intolerant or for whom a statin is contraindicated, and are unable to reach LDL-C goals with ezetimibe alone,
- in people already being treated with the combination of bempedoic acid and ezetimibe as separate tablets with or without statin.

== Contraindications ==
In the EU, it must not be used in pregnant or breast-feeding women. Using during pregnancy is not recommended in the US.

== History ==
The European Medicines Agency recommended approval of bempedoic acid/ezetimibe (Nustendi) in the EU in January 2020.

Bempedoic acid/ezetimibe was approved in the United States in February 2020, and in the European Union in March 2020.

Two studies showed that bempedoic acid and ezetimibe effectively reduced LDL cholesterol levels in participants with hypercholesterolemia and heart disease or who were at high risk of heart disease. High cholesterol is a risk factor for heart disease.

The first study involved 382 participants also taking the maximum tolerated doses of statins. After three months, LDL cholesterol levels were reduced by 36% in participants taking bempedoic acid and ezetimibe compared with a reduction of 23% with ezetimibe alone, 17% with bempedoic acid alone and an increase of around 2% with placebo (a dummy treatment).

The second study involved 269 participants with high cholesterol levels who were not able to take a statin or were taking a low dose of a statin. All the participants were also taking ezetimibe. After three months, LDL cholesterol levels were reduced by 23% in participants taking bempedoic acid in addition to ezetimibe compared with an increase of around 5% in participants taking placebo and ezetimibe.

A pooled analysis of data from patients enrolled in four phase III bempedoic acid trials found that bempedoic acid/ezetimibe lowered LDL-C by 39.2% compared to placebo in patients not taking statins; bempedoic acid monotherapy lowered it by 26.5%.
