= Ezetimibe/rosuvastatin =

Cholesterol medication

- Ezetimibe (top) and rosuvastatin (bottom)

Combination of
- Ezetimibe: Hypolipidemic agent
- Rosuvastatin: Statin

Clinical data
- Trade names: Ridutrink, Roszet, others
- AHFS/Drugs.com: Multum Consumer Information
- License data: US DailyMed: Ezetimibe and rosuvastatin
- Pregnancy category: AU: D
- Routes of administration: By mouth
- ATC code: C10BA06 (WHO)

Legal status
- Legal status: AU: S4 (Prescription only); US: ℞-only; EU: Rx-only; In general: ℞ (Prescription only)

Identifiers
- KEGG: D11520

Ezetimibe/rosuvastatin, sold under the brand name Ridutrin among others, is a combination medication used to treat high cholesterol. In some countries it is sold as a kit or a pack containing two distinct pills.

The combination was approved for medical use in the United States in March 2021.

== Medical uses ==
Ezetimibe/rosuvastatin is indicated as an adjunct to diet in people with primary non-familial hyperlipidemia to reduce low-density lipoprotein cholesterol (LDL-C); and alone or as an adjunct to other LDL-C-lowering therapies in people with homozygous familial hypercholesterolemia (HoFH) to reduce LDL-C.

== Pharmacology ==
Ezetimibe/rosuvastatin combines two lipid-lowering therapies.

- Ezetimibe inhibits NPC1L1, the transporter that is responsible for absorption of dietary cholesterol from the intestine.
- Rosuvastatin inhibits HMG-CoA reductase, an enzyme involved in synthesis of new cholesterol in the liver.
