= Ezetimibe/atorvastatin =

Cholesterol medication

Combination of
- Ezetimibe: Hypolipidemic agent
- Atorvastatin: Statin

Clinical data
- Trade names: Liptruzet, Atozet
- Routes of administration: By mouth
- ATC code: C10BA05 (WHO)

Legal status
- Legal status: AU: S4 (Prescription only); US: ℞-only

Identifiers
- PubChem CID: 16007392
- KEGG: D10385

Ezetimibe/atorvastatin (trade names Liptruzet, Atozet) is a cholesterol lowering combination drug. In the United States, it was approved in May 2013, by the Food and Drug Administration for the treatment of elevated low-density lipoprotein (LDL) in patients with primary or mixed hyperlipidemia as adjunctive therapy to diet. It has also been approved to reduce elevated total cholesterol and elevated LDL in patients diagnosed with homozygous familial hypercholesterolemia as an adjunctive treatment to other hyperlipidemia treatments.

Some cardiologists opposed the approval because, while the combination reduced LDL cholesterol in a clinical trial, it did not lower rates of heart disease. A separate clinical trial evaluating the endpoints of heart attacks, strokes and heart-related deaths was scheduled to conclude in 2014.

Liptruzet was withdrawn from sale by its manufacturer in June 2015, but not for reasons of safety or effectiveness.

== Mechanism of action ==
This combination drug works to reduce cholesterol levels through two different pathways. The ezetimibe component of the medication works by inhibiting cholesterol absorption from food while the atorvastatin component inhibits intrinsic cholesterol production in the liver.

== Safety ==
- The drug is not safe to use in patients with active liver disease or unexplained persistent elevations in hepatic transaminase.
- Women that are pregnant or may become pregnant should not use the drug. It is a teratogenic agent that may disrupt the growth and development of a fetus. Immediate discontinuation is recommended in patients that become pregnant while taking this drug.

== Adverse effects ==
Commonly reported adverse effects include:

- Musculoskeletal pain
- Elevated liver enzymes (AST and ALT)
- Gastrointestinal problems such as abdominal pain and nausea

== See also ==
- Ezetimibe
- Ezetimibe/simvastatin
