= C3H5NO =

The molecular formula C_{3}H_{5}NO (molar mass: 71.08 g/mol, exact mass: 71.0371 u) may refer to:

- Acrylamide (repeating unit in polyacrylamide)
- 2-Azetidinone
- Isoxazoline
- Lactonitrile
- Oxazoline
- Ethyl isocyanate
