= Nir Barzilai =

Israeli geneticist

- ניר ברזילי
- Born: December 27, 1955 (age 70); Haifa, Israel
- Citizenship: United States of America and Israel
- Education: Technion – Israel Institute of Technology
- Known for: biology of aging, genetics of exceptional longevity
- Awards: Irving S. Wright Award of Distinction in Aging Research Award (September 2010)
- Scientific career
- Fields: genetics and biology of aging, endocrinology/diabetes
- Workplaces: Albert Einstein College of Medicine

Nir Barzilai (Hebrew: ניר ברזילי; born December 27, 1955) is an Israeli geneticist and longevity researcher.

== Biography ==
Barzilai is the founding director of the Institute for Aging Research, the Nathan Shock Center of Excellence in the Basic Biology of Aging and the Paul F. Glenn Center for the Biology of Human Aging Research at Albert Einstein College of Medicine (Einstein). He also directs the Longevity Genes Project, a genetics study of over 600 families of centenarians and their children. The participants are all Ashkenazi Jews, a group selected for their genetic homogeneity, which makes it easier to identify significant genetic variations. Barzilai found that many of the centenarians had very high levels of HDL. Barzilai also co-founded of CohBar, Inc., a biotechnology company developing mitochondria based therapeutics to treat diseases associated with aging.

Barzilai discovered several "longevity genes" in humans that were validated by others. These include variants in genes involved in cholesterol metabolism (CETP and APOC3 ), metabolism (ADIPOQ and TSHR) and growth (IGF1R). These genes appear to protect centenarians against major age-related diseases, such as cardiovascular disease, cancer, type 2 diabetes and dementia.

Treatments for age-related diseases were under development based on Barzilai's work. A collaboration with Merck conducted early-stage clinical trials but ultimately abandoned Anacetrapib. The diabetes research is led by CohBar Inc., a biotech company that Barzilai helped co-found.

In addition to his "longevity gene" research, Barzilai studies key mechanisms involved in the biology of aging, including how nutrients and genetics influence lifespan. He has also proposed metformin as a tool to target aging and has run the Metformin in Longevity Study (completed May 2018) He is also investigating how mental decline and personality affect longevity. Barzilai believes that metformin will extend human lifespan. He has pointed to studies suggesting that diabetics who take metformin tend to live longer than non-diabetics. In support of this, a large study previously showed that diabetic patients on metformin had a longer lifespan compared to non-diabetic individuals who were not on the drug.

Barzilai was born in Haifa, Israel. During his national service in the Israel Defense Forces, he served as a medical instructor. In 1976, he served as a medical officer in Operation Entebbe. He was the Israeli army's chief medic from 1977 to 1985. He studied medicine at the Technion – Israel Institute of Technology, obtaining his MD in 1985. He interned at Rambam Medical Center in Haifa, Hadassah Medical Center in Jerusalem, and the Royal Free Hospital in London. He first came to the U.S. in 1987 as a resident at Yale University. He joined Einstein in 1993 as an instructor of medicine (endocrinology).

== Selected publications ==
- Age Later: Secrets of the Healthiest, Sharpest Centenarians (2020)
