= Esperion Therapeutics =

American pharmaceutical company

Esperion Therapeutics, Inc.
- Company type: Public
- Traded as: Nasdaq: ESPR; Russell 2000 Component
- Industry: Pharmaceutical
- Founded: 2008; 18 years ago
- Founder: Dr. Roger Newton
- Headquarters: Ann Arbor, Michigan
- Key people: Sheldon Koenig (president and CEO)
- Net income: ▼US$269.1 million (2020)
- Total assets: ▲US$381.6 million (2020)
- Website: Esperion.com
- Footnotes / references financial information

Esperion Therapeutics, Inc. is a publicly traded American pharmaceutical company focused on the development of bempedoic acid, an orally available small molecule designed to lower elevated levels of LDL-C. The company is headquartered in Ann Arbor, Michigan.

== History ==
=== The first Esperion ===
The first Esperion was founded in 1998 by Dr. Roger Newton to focus on the in-licensing and development of drugs to modulate HDL cholesterol (HDL-c).

Pfizer acquired the original Esperion in February 2004 for US$1,300,000,000. It's believed this was a defensive move by Pfizer to prevent ETC-216 (apoA-1 Milano, Esperion's lead drug candidate) from falling into competitors' hands. ETC-216 increased the levels of ApoA-1, the major protein in HDL cholesterol (HDL-c), the so-called "good cholesterol". It was believed that raising the levels of ApoA-1 (or HDL-c) in the body would reduce cardiovascular disease risk. At the time, Pfizer was the leader in developing a promising new class of drugs known as CETP inhibitors (CETPi). These drugs also raised HDL-c. However, almost 3 years later, in late 2006, Pfizer's CETPi drug (torcetrapib) failed in the final stages of clinical development. Pfizer terminated the development program for torcetrapib and reportedly ended all other cardiovascular drug development programs, including drug development programs for ETC-216 and the other programs acquired from Esperion.

=== The second Esperion ===
In May 2008, Dr. Roger Newton, negotiated with Pfizer to acquire the patent estates for two drug candidates (including ETC-1002/bempedoic acid/Nexletol) discovered by the original Esperion team and raised capital from four venture capital firms to found the "new" Esperion. This led to a second independent period for the company, focused almost exclusively on the development of ETC-1002, a drug which lowers the levels of LDL-cholesterol (LDL-c) the so-called "bad cholesterol" and targeted for patients that could not - or would not - take statins (statins are the standard-of-care medicine for lowering levels of bad cholesterol) .

In June 2013, Esperion became a public company again through an initial public offering. As of April 2014, Esperion is traded on NASDAQ under the symbol "ESPR".

== Products ==
The company's main products are NEXLIZET (bempedoic acid and ezetimibe) and NEXLETOL (bempedoic acid), the first approved oral, once-daily, non-statin LDL-Cholesterol (LDL-C) lowering combination medicine that is now available in U.S. pharmacies. Further products include NILEMDO (also a ATP Citrate Lyase inhibitor like NEXLETOL) and NUSTENDI (bempedoic acid and ezetimibe like NEXLIZET).
