= Ezetimibe/simvastatin =

Drug combination used for the treatment of dyslipidemia

Combination of
- Ezetimibe: Hypolipidemic agent
- Simvastatin: Hypolipidemic agent

Clinical data
- Pronunciation: /ɛˈzɛtɪmɪb ˌsɪmvəˈstætɪn/
- Trade names: Vytorin (US), Inegy (EU)
- License data: US DailyMed: Vytorin
- Routes of administration: By mouth
- ATC code: C10BA02 (WHO)

Legal status
- Legal status: AU: S4 (Prescription only); US: ℞-only; In general: ℞ (Prescription only)

Identifiers
- CAS Number: 163222-33-1; 79902-63-9
- PubChem CID: 9832423
- DrugBank: DB00973; DB00641
- ChemSpider: 21106308
- UNII: EOR26LQQ24; AGG2FN16EV
- KEGG: D10257
- CompTox Dashboard (EPA): DTXSID80196177

Chemical and physical data
- Formula: C_{49}H_{59}F_{2}NO_{8}
- Molar mass: 828.007 g·mol^{−1}
- 3D model (JSmol): Interactive image
- SMILES: CCC(C)(C)C(=O)OC1CC(C=C2C1C(C(C=C2)C)CCC3CC(CC(=O)O3)O)C.C1=CC(=CC=C1C2C(C(=O)N2C3=CC=C(C=C3)F)CCC(C4=CC=C(C=C4)F)O)O
- InChI: InChI=1S/C25H38O5.C24H21F2NO3/c1-6-25(4,5)24(28)30-21-12-15(2)11-17-8-7-16(3)20(23(17)21)10-9-19-13-18(26)14-22(27)29-19;25-17-5-1-15(2-6-17)22(29)14-13-21-23(16-3-11-20(28)12-4-16)27(24(21)30)19-9-7-18(26)8-10-19/h7-8,11,15-16,18-21,23,26H,6,9-10,12-14H2,1-5H3;1-12,21-23,28-29H,13-14H2/t15-,16-,18+,19+,20-,21-,23-;21-,22+,23-/m01/s1; Key:PNAMDJVUJCJOIX-IUNFJCKHSA-N

Ezetimibe/simvastatin is a drug combination used for the treatment of dyslipidemia. It is a combination of ezetimibe (known as Zetia in the United States) and the statin drug simvastatin (known as Zocor in the US).

Ezetimibe reduces blood cholesterol by acting at the brush border of the small intestine and inhibiting the absorption of cholesterol, leading to a decrease in the delivery of intestinal cholesterol to the liver.

Simvastatin is an HMG-CoA reductase inhibitor or statin. It works by blocking an enzyme that is necessary for the body to make cholesterol. Generic versions were approved in 2017. The combination preparation is marketed by Merck & Co. under the trade names Vytorin in the US and Inegy in the European Union. In 2018, it was the 349th most commonly prescribed medication in the United States, with more than 800 thousand prescriptions.

== Contraindications ==
- Acute liver disease
- Pregnancy and breast feeding

== Side effects ==
- Myopathy
- Rhabdomyolysis
- Myalgia
- Pain in extremities, abdomen
- Angioedema
- Hepatitis
- Eczema
- Fatigue
- Headache
- Influenza, pharyngitis, sinusitis and upper respiratory tract infection

== Interactions ==
- Cyclosporine
- Danazol
- Protease inhibitors
- Verapamil
- Amiodarone
- Large amounts of niacin (nicotinic acid), grapefruit juice
- Erythromycin, telithromycin, clarithromycin
- Nefazodone

== Pharmacology ==
The combination of ezetimibe and simvastatin treats both sources of cholesterol; absorption in the intestine of both biliary and dietary cholesterol, and production in the liver and peripheral tissues. It is thought that the treatment of high cholesterol from both sources is likely to result in lower cholesterol levels, particularly LDL cholesterol. In a clinical study, it was shown that the combination of ezetimibe and simvastatin was superior to atorvastatin in lowering LDL cholesterol.

== Clinical trials ==
=== IMPROVE-IT trial ===
Published in 2015, the IMProved Reduction of Outcomes: Vytorin Efficacy International Trial (IMPROVE-IT) randomized 18,144 patients with ACS to simvastatin 40 mg/d plus ezetimibe 10 mg/d or simvastatin alone. With median follow-up of 6 years, simvastatin+ezetimibe was found to reduce the primary outcome of CV mortality, major CV event, or nonfatal stroke (34.7% vs. 32.7%; P=0.016; NNT 50 per 7 years or NNT 350 per 1 year ). There was no reduction in all-cause or CV mortality with simvastatin+ezetimibe, though there was a reduction in MI and stroke.

=== ENHANCE trial data ===
The two-year ENHANCE Study failed to provide evidence that ezetimibe/simvastatin was better than simvastatin (a generic medication) in terms of achieving a lower change from baseline in carotid intima-media thickness despite lower LDL levels in a population of patients with heterozygous familial hypercholesterolemia (a form of high cholesterol that affects less than 1% of patients). Clinical events such as heart attack and stroke were not measured as primary or secondary endpoints of the study making it impossible to determine Vytorin's effect on these events.

=== Subsequent debate and enquiries ===
The American College of Cardiology released a statement suggesting that "major clinical decisions not be made on the basis of the ENHANCE study alone", given the small and unique patient population, 720 patients in an Amsterdam hospital with heterozygous familial hypercholesterolemia.

Merck and Schering Plough have reported that they have three trials underway to focus on outcomes, measuring the drug's effect on heart attacks and strokes in patients.

These results were presented in full at the American College of Cardiology meeting on 30 March 2008, two years after the last patient completed the study. The House Committee on Energy and Commerce conducted an inquiry into the delayed disclosure of the study data.

== Advertising campaign ==
In the United States, Vytorin featured a television advertising campaign showing a series of split-screen images of a person and a food item to make the point that cholesterol comes from two sources and can be absorbed from food or manufactured by the body, and that heredity plays a role in the latter. This point is a departure from the commonly held belief that high cholesterol only comes from the food that you eat. In each commercial, the person's features or clothing and the food plated to emphasize the resemblance between the person and the food. For example, in one advertisement a woman wearing a yellow shirt and a pin is juxtaposed with a similarly colored piece of pie.
