= ATP citrate synthase =

Class of enzymes

Identifiers
- EC no.: 2.3.3.8
- CAS no.: 9027-95-6

Databases
- BRENDA: enzyme data
- ExPASy: NiceZyme view
- KEGG: enzyme entry
- MetaCyc: metabolic pathway
- Rhea: reactions
- PDB structures: RCSB PDB PDBe PDBsum
- Gene Ontology: AmiGO / QuickGO
Search
- PMC: articles
- PubMed: articles
- NCBI: proteins

Human ATP citrate lyase
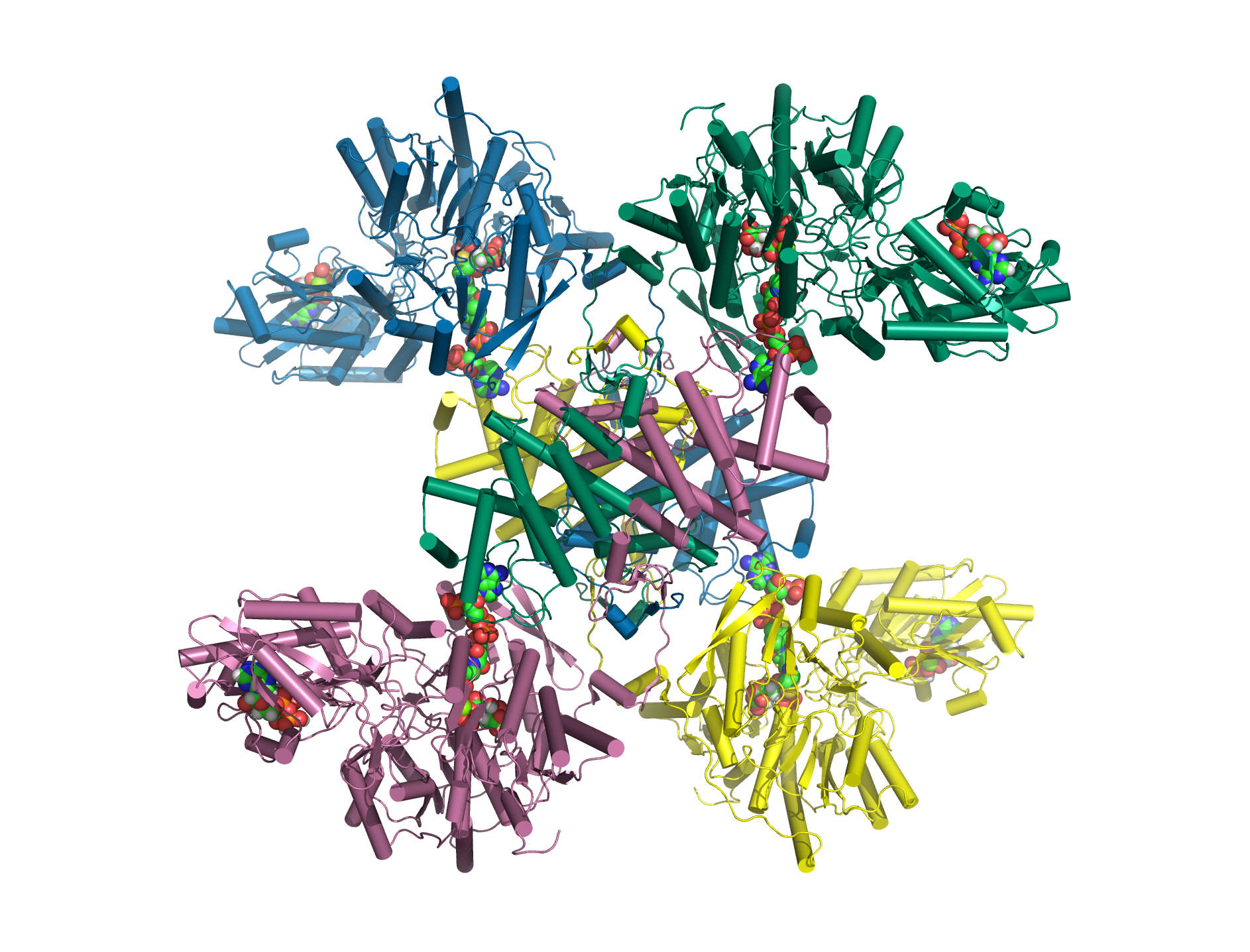
- Crystal structure of human ATP citrate lyase in complex with citrate, coenzyme A and Mg.ADP.

Identifiers
- Symbol: ACLY
- Alt. symbols: ACL
- NCBI gene: 47
- HGNC: 115
- OMIM: 108728
- PDB: 3MWE, 3PFF, 5TDE, 5TDF, 5TDM, 5TDZ, 5TE1, 5TEQ, 5TES, 5TET, 6HXH, 6HXK, 6HXL, 6HXM, 6O0H, 6QFB 3MWD, 3MWE, 3PFF, 5TDE, 5TDF, 5TDM, 5TDZ, 5TE1, 5TEQ, 5TES, 5TET, 6HXH, 6HXK, 6HXL, 6HXM, 6O0H, 6QFB
- RefSeq: NM_001096
- UniProt: P53396

Other data
- EC number: 2.3.3.8
- Locus: Chr. 17 q21.2
Search for
- Structures: Swiss-model
- Domains: InterPro

ATP citrate synthase (also known as ATP citrate lyase (ACLY)) is an enzyme that in animals catalyzes an important step in fatty acid biosynthesis. By converting citrate to acetyl-CoA, the enzyme links carbohydrate metabolism, which yields citrate as an intermediate, with fatty acid biosynthesis, which consumes acetyl-CoA. In plants, ATP citrate lyase generates cytosolic acetyl-CoA precursors of thousands of specialized metabolites, including waxes, sterols, and polyketides.

== Function ==
ATP citrate lyase is the primary enzyme responsible for the synthesis of cytosolic acetyl-CoA in many tissues. The enzyme is a tetramer of apparently identical subunits. In animals, the product, acetyl-CoA, is used in several important biosynthetic pathways, including lipogenesis and cholesterogenesis. It is activated by insulin.

In plants, ATP citrate lyase generates acetyl-CoA for cytosolically synthesized metabolites; Acetyl-CoA is not transported across subcellular membranes of plants. Such metabolites include: elongated fatty acids (used in seed oils, membrane phospholipids, the ceramide moieties of sphingolipids, cuticle, cutin, and suberin); flavonoids; malonic acid; acetylated phenolics, alkaloids, isoprenoids, anthocyanins, and sugars; and, mevalonate-derived isoprenoids (e.g., sesquiterpenes, sterols, brassinosteroids); malonyl and acyl-derivatives (d-amino acids, malonylated flavonoids, acylated, prenylated and malonated proteins). De novo fatty acid biosynthesis in plants occurs in plastids; thus, ATP citrate lyase is not relevant to this pathway.

== Reaction ==
ATP citrate lyase is responsible for catalyzing the conversion of citric acid and coenzyme A (CoA) to acetyl-CoA and oxaloacetic acid, driven by hydrolysis of adenosine triphosphate (ATP). In the presence of ATP and CoA, citrate lyase catalyzes the cleavage of citrate to yield acetyl-CoA, oxaloacetate, adenosine diphosphate (ADP), and orthophosphate (P_{i}):

citric acid
+ coenzyme A
ATP
ADP + P_{i}
oxaloacetic acid
+
acetyl-CoA

This enzyme was formerly given the EC number 4.1.3.8.

== Location ==
The enzyme is cytosolic in plants and animals.

== Structure ==
The enzyme is composed of two subunits in green plants (including Chlorophyceae, Marchantimorpha, Bryopsida, Pinaceae, monocotyledons, and eudicots), species of fungi, glaucophytes, Chlamydomonas, and prokaryotes.

Animal ACL enzymes are homomeric; a fusion of the ACLA and ACLB genes probably occurred early in the evolutionary history of this kingdom.

The mammalian ATP citrate lyase has a N-terminal citrate-binding domain that adopts a Rossmann fold, followed by a CoA binding domain and CoA-ligase domain and finally a C-terminal citrate synthase domain. The cleft between the CoA binding and citrate synthase domains forms the active site of the enzyme, where both citrate and acetyl-coenzyme A bind.

In 2010, a structure of truncated human ATP citrate lyase was determined using X-ray diffraction to a resolution of 2.10 Å. In 2019, a full-length structure of human ACLY in complex with the substrates coenzyme A, citrate and Mg.ADP was determined by X-ray crystallography to a resolution of 3.2 Å. Moreover, in 2019 a full-length structure of ACLY in complex with an inhibitor was determined by cryo-EM methods to a resolution of 3.7 Å. Additional structures of heteromeric ACLY-A/B from the green sulfur bacteria Chlorobium limicola and the archaeon Methanosaeta concilii show that the architecture of ACLY is evolutionarily conserved. Full length ACLY structures showed that the tetrameric protein oligomerizes via its C-terminal domain. The C-terminal domain had not been observed in the previously determined truncated crystal structures. The C-terminal region of ACLY assembles in a tetrameric module that is structurally similar to citryl-CoA lyase (CCL) found in deep branching bacteria. This CCL module catalyses the cleavage of the citryl-CoA intermediate into the products acetyl-CoA and oxaloacetate. In 2019, cryo-EM structures of human ACLY, alone or bound to substrates or products were reported as well. ACLY forms a homotetramer with a rigid citrate synthase homology (CSH) module, flanked by four flexible acetyl-CoA synthetase homology (ASH) domains; CoA is bound at the CSH–ASH interface in mutually exclusive productive or unproductive conformations. The structure of a catalytic mutant of ACLY in the presence of ATP, citrate and CoA substrates reveals a CoA and phosphor-citrate intermediate in the N-terminal domain. Cryo-EM structures of products bound ACLY and substrates bound ACLY were also determined at 3.0 Å and 3.1 Å. An EM structure of mutant E599Q in complex with CoA and phospho-citrate intermediate was determined at resolution of 2.9 Å. Comparison between these structures of apo-ACLY and ligands bound ACLY demonstrated conformational changes on ASH domain (N-terminal domain) when different ligands bind.

== Pharmacology ==
The enzyme's action can be inhibited by the coenzyme A-conjugate of bempedoic acid, a compound which lowers LDL cholesterol in humans. The drug was approved by the Food and Drug Administration in February 2020 for use in the United States.
