= Nocardicin-A epimerase =

Identifiers
- EC no.: 5.1.1.14
- CAS no.: 118246-75-6

Databases
- IntEnz: IntEnz view
- BRENDA: BRENDA entry
- ExPASy: NiceZyme view
- KEGG: KEGG entry
- MetaCyc: metabolic pathway
- PRIAM: profile
- PDB structures: RCSB PDB PDBe PDBsum
- Gene Ontology: AmiGO / QuickGO
Search
- PMC: articles
- PubMed: articles
- NCBI: proteins

Nocardicin-A epimerase (EC 5.1.1.14) is an enzyme that catalyzes two related chemical reactions in the biosynthetic sequence to nocardicin A in Nocardia uniformis. Its effect is to invert the stereochemistry of the amino acid sidechain in the substrate, isonocardicin C, to give its epimer, nocardicin C.

isonocardicin C
nocardicin C

The enzyme can alternatively form the eimer of an oxime derivative of isonocardicin C (isonocardicin A), which produces nocardicin A.

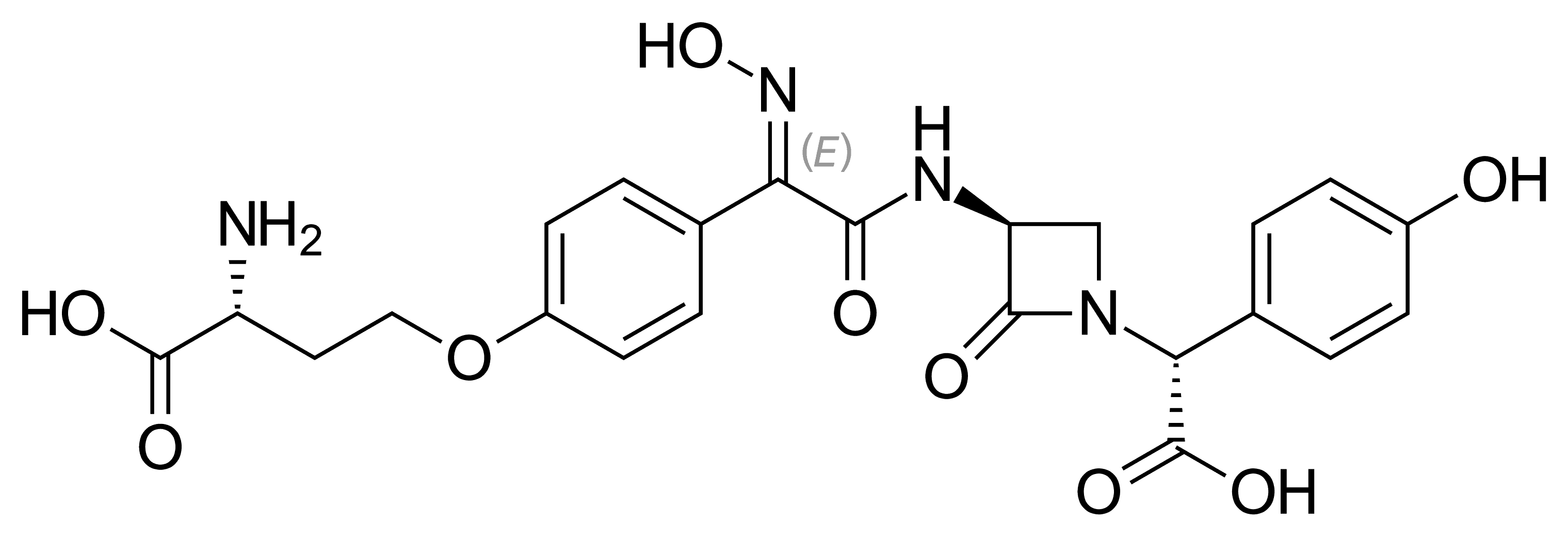
Nocardicin A, a β-lactam antibiotic

This enzyme belongs to the family of isomerases, specifically those racemases and epimerases acting on amino acids and derivatives. The systematic name of this enzyme class is nocardicin-A epimerase. This enzyme is also called isonocardicin A epimerase.
