= Carumonam =

Chemical compound

Clinical data
- Trade names: Amasulin
- AHFS/Drugs.com: International Drug Names
- ATC code: J01DF02 (WHO)

Identifiers
- IUPAC name: 2-[(Z)-[1-(2-Amino-1,3-thiazol-4-yl)-2-[[(2S,3S)-2-(carbamoyloxymethyl)-4-oxo-1-sulfoazetidin-3-yl]amino]-2-oxoethylidene]amino]oxyacetic acid
- CAS Number: 87638-04-8
- PubChem CID: 6540466
- DrugBank: DB13553
- ChemSpider: 5022832
- UNII: 486890PI06
- ChEBI: CHEBI:55486
- ChEMBL: ChEMBL1614658
- CompTox Dashboard (EPA): DTXSID3048312

Chemical and physical data
- Formula: C_{12}H_{14}N_{6}O_{10}S_{2}
- Molar mass: 466.40 g·mol^{−1}
- 3D model (JSmol): Interactive image
- SMILES: C1=C(N=C(S1)N)/C(=N/OCC(=O)O)/C(=O)N[C@H]2[C@H](N(C2=O)S(=O)(=O)O)COC(=O)N
- InChI: InChI=1S/C12H14N6O10S2/c13-11-15-4(3-29-11)7(17-28-2-6(19)20)9(21)16-8-5(1-27-12(14)23)18(10(8)22)30(24,25)26/h3,5,8H,1-2H2,(H2,13,15)(H2,14,23)(H,16,21)(H,19,20)(H,24,25,26)/b17-7-/t5-,8+/m1/s1; Key:UIMOJFJSJSIGLV-JNHMLNOCSA-N

Carumonam (INN) is a monobactam antibiotic previously sold in Japan under the brand name Amasulin. One of only four members of its class, Carumonam was withdrawn sometime before 2021, leaving only Aztreonam on the market. It is very resistant to beta-lactamases, which means that it is more difficult for bacteria to break down using β-lactamase enzymes.
