= Tigemonam =

Names
- IUPAC name 2-[[1-(2-Amino-1,3-thiazol-4-yl)- 2-[[(3S)-2,2-dimethyl-4-oxo-1- sulfooxyazetidin-3-yl]amino]-2- oxoethylidene]amino]oxyacetic acid
- Other names Tigemen

Identifiers
CAS Number	102507-71-1
3D model (JSmol)	Interactive image
ChemSpider	7851210
PubChem CID	9576769
UNII	82H1LDS5D0
CompTox Dashboard (EPA)	DTXSID50883103
- InChI: InChI=1S/C12H15N5O9S2/c1-12(2)8(10(21)17(12)26-28(22,23)24)15-9(20)7(16-25-3-6(18)19)5-4-27-11(13)14-5/h4,8H,3H2,1-2H3,(H2,13,14)(H,15,20)(H,18,19)(H,22,23,24)/b16-7-/t8-/m1/s1 Key: VAMSVIZLXJOLHZ-QWFSEIHXSA-N; InChI=1/C12H15N5O9S2/c1-12(2)8(10(21)17(12)26-28(22,23)24)15-9(20)7(16-25-3-6(18)19)5-4-27-11(13)14-5/h4,8H,3H2,1-2H3,(H2,13,14)(H,15,20)(H,18,19)(H,22,23,24)/b16-7-/t8-/m1/s1 Key: VAMSVIZLXJOLHZ-QWFSEIHXBK
- SMILES: CC1([C@@H](C(=O)N1OS(=O)(=O)O)NC(=O)/C(=N\OCC(=O)O)/C2=CSC(=N2)N)C

Properties
Chemical formula	C_{12}H_{15}N_{5}O_{9}S_{2}
Molar mass	437.40 g·mol^{−1}
- Except where otherwise noted, data are given for materials in their standard state (at 25 °C [77 °F], 100 kPa). verify (what is ?) Infobox references

Tigemonam is a monobactam antibiotic.
