= Tabtoxinine β-lactam =

Names
- Systematic IUPAC name (2S)-2-Amino-4-[(3S)-3-hydroxy-2-oxoazetidin-3-yl]butanoic acid
- Other names (αS,3S)-α-Amino-3-hydroxy-2-oxo-3-azetidinebutanoic acid; (−)-Tabtoxinine β-lactam

Identifiers
CAS Number	65709-93-5
3D model (JSmol)	Interactive image
ChemSpider	24751854
PubChem CID	3035052
UNII	2UUE5D9555
CompTox Dashboard (EPA)	DTXSID80984253
- InChI: InChI=1S/C7H12N2O4/c8-4(5(10)11)1-2-7(13)3-9-6(7)12/h4,13H,1-3,8H2,(H,9,12)(H,10,11)/t4-,7-/m0/s1 Key: BSUXZTMOMIFYBF-FFWSUHOLSA-N
- SMILES: C1[C@](C(=O)N1)(CC[C@@H](C(=O)O)N)O

Properties
Chemical formula	C_{7}H_{12}N_{2}O_{4}
Molar mass	188.183 g·mol^{−1}
- Except where otherwise noted, data are given for materials in their standard state (at 25 °C [77 °F], 100 kPa). Infobox references

Tabtoxinine β-lactam is a monobactam antibiotic derived from tabtoxin. Unlike other β-lactam antibiotics, which covalently inhibit penicillin-binding proteins, tabtoxinine β-lactam covalently inhibits glutamine synthetase.
