= Hypolipoproteinemia =

- Specialty: Endocrinology

Hypolipoproteinemia, hypolipidemia, or hypolipidaemia (British English) is a form of dyslipidemia that is defined by abnormally lowered levels of any or all lipids and/or lipoproteins in the blood. It occurs in genetic disorders (e.g. hypoalphalipoproteinemia, hypobetalipoproteinemia), malnutrition, malabsorption, wasting disease, cancer, hyperthyroidism, and liver disease.

== Causes ==
Causes of hypolipidemia include:

- Hypobetalipoproteinemia (low levels of LDL cholesterol or apolipoprotein B)
- Malnutrition
- Malabsorption
- Wasting disease
- Certain cancers
- Hyperthyroidism (overactive thyroid)
- Liver disorders

== Diagnosis ==
It can be diagnosed via blood study that identifies fat particles. The patient must fast overnight to prevent interference from fat in the blood due to food intake. The criteria for this (without the involvement of cholesterol-lowering drugs) are total cholesterol levels below 120 mg/dL and LDL cholesterol levels under 50 mg/dL.

=== Critical illness ===
In the setting of critical illness, low cholesterol levels are predictive of clinical deterioration, and are correlated with altered cytokine levels.

In humans with genetic loss-of-function variants in one copy of the ANGPTL3 gene, the serum LDL-C levels are reduced. In those with loss-of-function variants in both copies of ANGPTL3, low LDL-C, low HDL-C, and low triglycerides are seen ("familial combined hypolipidemia").

Hooft disease is a rare condition evidenced by low blood lipid level, red rash and mental and physical retardation.

== Treatment ==
Vitamin E supplements have shown to help children with the deficiency.

== See also ==
- ANGPTL3 – Protein-coding gene in the species Homo sapiens
- Hypercholesterolemia – High levels of cholesterol in the blood
- Primary hyperlipoproteinemia – Abnormally elevated levels of lipids or lipoproteins in the blood
