= 2-Azetidinone =

Names
- IUPAC name 2-Azetidinone
- Other names β-Propiolactam; Azetidin-2-one; 2-Azacyclobutanone

Identifiers
CAS Number	930-21-2
3D model (JSmol)	Interactive image
ChemSpider	120480
ECHA InfoCard	100.156.473
PubChem CID	136721
CompTox Dashboard (EPA)	DTXSID30239225
- InChI: InChI=1S/C3H5NO/c5-3-1-2-4-3/h1-2H2,(H,4,5) Key: MNFORVFSTILPAW-UHFFFAOYSA-N
- SMILES: C1CNC1=O

Properties
Chemical formula	C_{3}H_{5}NO
Molar mass	71.079 g·mol^{−1}
- Except where otherwise noted, data are given for materials in their standard state (at 25 °C [77 °F], 100 kPa). Infobox references

2-Azetidinone is a chemical compound with the molecular formula C_{3}H_{5}NO. It is the simplest β-lactam and it forms the central core structure of the β-lactam antibiotics and certain cholesterol medications.

== Chemical structure ==
The molecular structure of 2-azetidinone features a highly strained four membered ring containing three carbon atoms and a nitrogen atom, with a carbonyl oxygen which is double bonded to the carbon position adjacent to the heteroatom. Because of the significant ring strain inherent to a four-membered geometry, the amide bond within 2-azetidinone is considerably more reactive toward nucleophilic attack than a typical acyclic amide.

== Synthesis ==
The synthesis of 2-azetidinone is primarily achieved through ring-closure reactions. The Staudinger synthesis, a [2+2] cycloaddition, reacts an imine with a ketene to form the four-membered core. The Gilman-Speeter reaction provides an alternative, using a Reformatsky reagent to achieve cyclization.

== Reactivity ==
The molecule’s reactivity is driven by its severe ring strain of approximately 26 kcal/mol. This strain prevents the nitrogen lone pair from fully delocalizing into the carbonyl group, rendering the carbonyl carbon highly electrophilic and susceptible to nucleophilic attack.

== Medical applications ==
The 2-azetidinone ring is the primary pharmacophore in β-lactam antibiotics, including penicillins, cephalosporins, and carbapenems. These compounds function by binding to bacterial transpeptidase enzymes, effectively inhibiting cell wall synthesis. Additionally, the derivative Ezetimibe utilizes the 2-azetidinone scaffold to inhibit intestinal cholesterol absorption.
