= Nocardicin A =

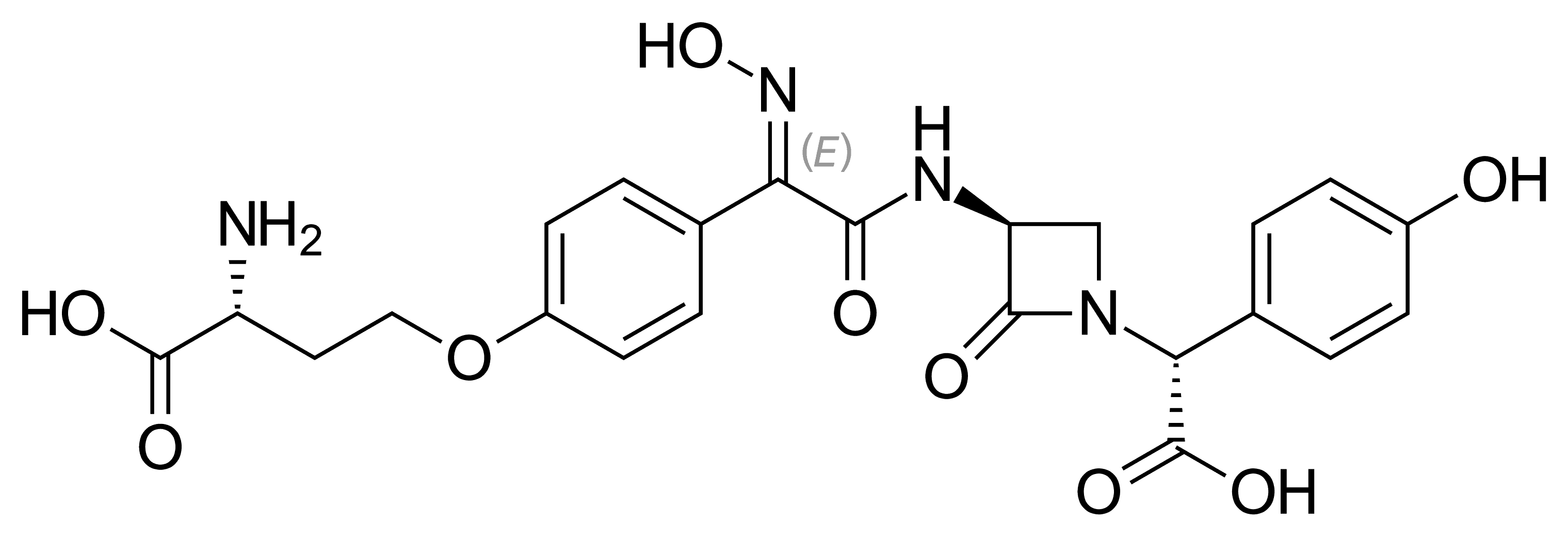

Names
- IUPAC name (2R)-2-Amino-4-[4-[N-hydroxy-C-[[(3S)-1- [(1R)-2-hydroxy-1-(4-hydroxyphenyl)-2- oxoethyl]-2-oxoazetidin-3- yl]carbamoyl]carbonimidoyl]phenoxy]butanoic acid

Identifiers
CAS Number	39391-39-4
3D model (JSmol)	Interactive image
ChemSpider	4925179
PubChem CID	6419429
UNII	R76HLW7Z19
CompTox Dashboard (EPA)	DTXSID901101375
- InChI: InChI=1S/C23H24N4O9/c24-16(22(31)32)9-10-36-15-7-3-12(4-8-15)18(26-35)20(29)25-17-11-27(21(17)30)19(23(33)34)13-1-5-14(28)6-2-13/h1-8,16-17,19,28,35H,9-11,24H2,(H,25,29)(H,31,32)(H,33,34)/b26-18+/t16-,17+,19-/m1/s1 Key: CTNZOGJNVIFEBA-TWTPMLPMSA-N
- SMILES: O=C(O)[C@@H](c1ccc(O)cc1)N3C(=O)[C@@H](NC(=O)\C(=N\O)c2ccc(OCC[C@H](C(=O)O)N)cc2)C3

Properties
Chemical formula	C_{23}H_{24}N_{4}O_{9}
Molar mass	500.46 g/mol
- Except where otherwise noted, data are given for materials in their standard state (at 25 °C [77 °F], 100 kPa). Infobox references

Nocardicin A is a monocyclic β-lactam antibiotic included in the monobactam subclass. It is obtained from the fermentation broth of a strain of actinomycetes Nocardia uniformis subsp. tsuyamenensis as a metabolic product catalyzed by the enzyme nocardicin-A epimerase. It is stereochemically and biologically related to penicillin and cephalosporins.

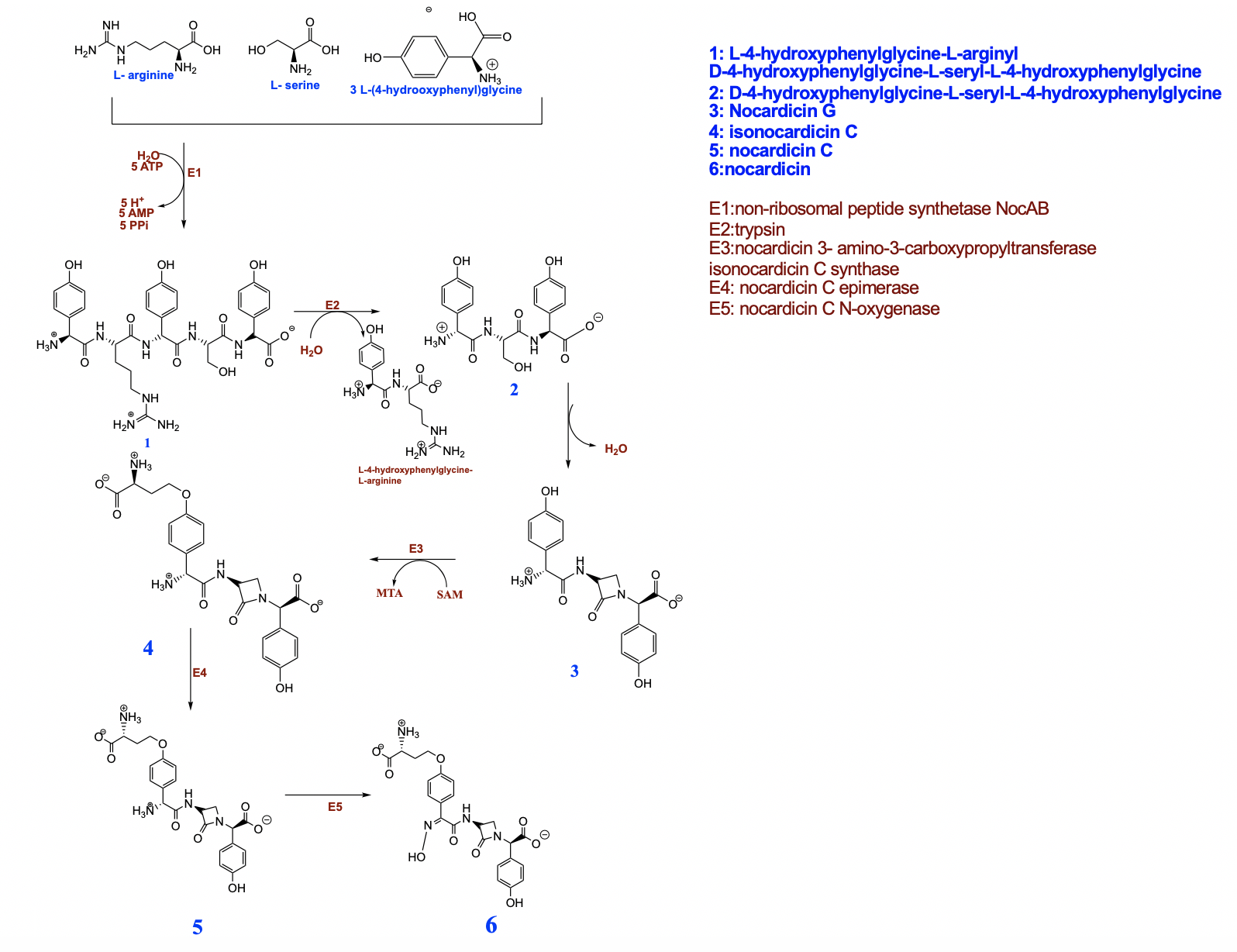
Biosynthesis of Nocardicin A
