= CETP inhibitor =

Drug class

- Drug class

Class identifiers
- Use: None as of 2026
- Biological target: Cholesterylester transfer protein

Legal status

A CETP inhibitor is a member of a class of drugs that inhibit cholesterylester transfer protein (CETP). They are intended to reduce the risk of atherosclerosis (a cardiovascular disease) by improving blood lipid levels. At least three medications within this class have failed to demonstrate a beneficial effect.

== Types ==
These drugs have generally failed in clinical trials, either causing a marked increase in deaths (torcetrapib), or having no meaningful clinical improvement despite HDL increases (dalcetrapib, evacetrapib).

Failed:

- Torcetrapib: failed in 2006 due to excess deaths in Phase III clinical trials.
- Dalcetrapib: development halted in May 2012 when Phase III trials failed to show clinically meaningful efficacy.
- Evacetrapib: development discontinued in 2015 due to insufficient efficacy.

Others:

- Anacetrapib: In 2017, the REVEAL trial based on more than 30,000 participants showed a modest benefit of the addition of anacetrapib to statin therapy. Merck halted the development of the drug in 2017, concluding it wasn't sufficiently effective to be a competitive product.
- Obicetrapib (TA-8995, AMG-899): Phase II results were reported in 2015 and Phase III trials beginning in 2023.

== Mechanism ==
Drugs in this class substantially increase HDL cholesterol, lower LDL cholesterol, and enhance reverse cholesterol transport.

CETP inhibitors inhibit cholesterylester transfer protein (CETP), which normally transfers cholesterol from HDL cholesterol to very low density or low density lipoproteins (VLDL or LDL). Inhibition of this process results in higher HDL levels and reduces LDL levels. CETP inhibitors do not reduce rates of mortality, heart attack, or stroke in patients already taking a statin.

== Pharmacogenomics ==
In 2015, a pharmacogenomic sub-study of the dal-OUTCOMES clinical trial on 5,749 individuals identified a genetic variant in the ADCY9 gene which modulates response to dalcetrapib. In patients with the rs1967309 'AA' genotype, there was a significant reduction in the rate of cardiovascular events in the dalcetrapib arm whereas non-carriers were at increased risk. Beginning in 2015, the efficacy of dalcetrapib in the genetic sub-population was being investigated in the dal-GenE trial.

== Chemical structures ==
Anacetrapib

Dalcetrapib

Evacetrapib

Obicetrapib

Torcetrapib
