= Citryl-CoA lyase =

Enzyme

citryl-CoA lyase

Identifiers
- EC no.: 4.1.3.34
- CAS no.: 131095-35-7

Databases
- IntEnz: IntEnz view
- BRENDA: BRENDA entry
- ExPASy: NiceZyme view
- KEGG: KEGG entry
- MetaCyc: metabolic pathway
- PRIAM: profile
- PDB structures: RCSB PDB PDBe PDBsum
- Gene Ontology: AmiGO / QuickGO
Search
- PMC: articles
- PubMed: articles
- NCBI: proteins

The enzyme citryl-CoA lyase (EC 4.1.3.34) catalyzes the chemical reaction

(3S)-citryl-CoA $\rightleftharpoons$ acetyl-CoA + oxaloacetate

This enzyme belongs to the family of lyases, specifically the oxo-acid-lyases, which cleave carbon–carbon bonds. The systematic name of this enzyme class is (3S)-citryl-CoA oxaloacetate-lyase (acetyl-CoA-forming). This enzyme is also called (3S)-citryl-CoA oxaloacetate-lyase. This enzyme participates in citrate cycle (tca cycle).
