= Tabtoxin =

Names
- Systematic IUPAC name (2S,3R)-2-{(2S)-2-Amino-4-[(3S)-3-hydroxy-2-oxoazetidin-3-yl]butanamido}-3-hydroxybutanoic acid
- Other names N-[(2S)-2-Amino-4-[(3S)-3-hydroxy-2-oxo-3-azetidinyl]-1-oxobutyl]-L-threonine; (S)-γ-(3-Hydroxy-2-oxo-3-azetidinyl)-L-α-aminobutyryl-L-threonine

Identifiers
CAS Number	40957-90-2
3D model (JSmol)	Interactive image
ChEBI	CHEBI:156429
ChemSpider	96964
PubChem CID	107817
UNII	H3YX70R64N
CompTox Dashboard (EPA)	DTXSID70961331
- InChI: InChI=1S/C11H19N3O6/c1-5(15)7(9(17)18)14-8(16)6(12)2-3-11(20)4-13-10(11)19/h5-7,15,20H,2-4,12H2,1H3,(H,13,19)(H,14,16)(H,17,18)/t5-,6+,7+,11+/m1/s1
- SMILES: O=C(O)[C@@H](NC(=O)[C@@H](N)CC[C@@]1(O)C(=O)NC1)[C@H](O)C

Properties
Chemical formula	C_{11}H_{19}N_{3}O_{6}
Molar mass	289.288 g·mol^{−1}
- Except where otherwise noted, data are given for materials in their standard state (at 25 °C [77 °F], 100 kPa). verify (what is ?) Infobox references

Tabtoxin, also known as wildfire toxin, is a monobactam-type phytotoxin produced by Pseudomonas syringae. It is the precursor to the antibiotic tabtoxinine β-lactam (TBL). It is produced by:

- Pseudomonas syringae pv. tabaci, the causal agent of the wildfire of tobacco
- P. syringae pv. coronafaciens
- P. syringae pv. garcae
- P. syringae BR2, which causes a disease of bean (Phaseolus vulgaris) similar to tobacco wildfire. This organism is closely related to P. syringae pv. tabaci but cannot be classified in the pathovar tabaci because it is not pathogenic on tobacco.

Tabtoxin is a dipeptide precursor to the biologically active form of TBL, differing by having an extra threonine attached by a peptide bond to the C terminus. Tabtoxin is required by BR2(R) for both chlorosis and lesion formation on bean. All mutations that affected tabtoxin production, whether spontaneous deletion or transposon-induced, also affected lesion formation, and in all cases, restoration of tabtoxin production also restored pathogenic symptoms. Other factors may be required for BR2 to be pathogenic on bean, but apparently these are in addition to tabtoxin production. This toxin is a irreversible inhibitor of glutamine synthetase.

== Self-resistance ==
Tabtoxin resistance protein (TTR) is an enzyme that catalyzes the acetylation of TBL, rendering tabtoxin-producing pathogens tolerant to their own phytotoxins. The structure of an inactivated mutant of TTR is solved with its natural cofactor acetyl-CoA to 1.55 Å resolution. The binary complex forms a characteristic V-shape for substrate binding and contains the four motifs conserved in the GCN5-related N-acetyltransferase (GNAT) superfamily, which also includes the histone acetyltransferases (HATs). There are reports that TTR possesses HAT activity and suggest an evolutionary relationship between TTR and other GNAT members.

The production of tabtoxin itself is also part of the self-resistance strategy. These pathogens produce TBL before tabtoxin is produced; to detoxify, the enzyme TblF links TBL to threonine (Thr), producing a non-toxic product.

== Biosynthesis ==
The biosynthetic precursors of tabtoxin were identified by the incorporation of 13C-labeled compounds. L-threonine and L-aspartate make up the side chain, while pyruvic acid and the methyl group of L-methionine make up β-lactam moiety. A biosynthetic model for the formation of TβL resembles that of lysine, where the first dedicated step is the DapA-catalyzed condensation of aspartic acid semialdehyde with pyruvate to form L-2,3-dihydropicolinate (DHDPA). Tabtoxin biosynthesis branches off from the lysine biosynthetic pathway before the formation of diaminopimelate (DAP). (Note: As additional evidence for this pathway, DapB (Dihydrodipicolinate reductase), a step between DHDPA and DAP, is required to produce both lysine and tabtoxin.) The 31-kb biosynthetic cluster consists of:

- TabA (P31851), an enzyme related to lysA (diaminopimelate decarboxylase)
- TabB (P31852), an enzyme related to dapD (THDPA succinyl-CoA succinyltransferase, THDPA-ST)
- TblA (P31850), an enzyme with no close paralogs (identified as a member of SAMe-dependent methyltransferase superfamily by InterPro)

This pathway produces TBL; the enzyme TblF finalize the synthesis by linking TBL to Thr to form tabtoxin. (Note: TblF is able to distinguish between TBL and the spontaneously-formed isomer TDL (tabtoxinine-δ-lactam). It also produces no "reversed" peptides.)

=== Factors affecting production ===
The effects of carbon, nitrogen sources, and amino acids on growth and tabtoxin production by pv. tabaci were examined by varying the components of a defined basal medium, which contained the following nutrients per liter: sucrose (10 g), KNO_{3} (5 g), MgSO_{4}·7H_{2}O (0.2 g), CaCl_{2}·2H_{2}O (0.11 g), FeSO_{4}·7H_{2}O (20 mg), NaH_{2}PO_{4}·2H_{2}O (0.9 g) and H_{2}PO_{4}·3H_{2}O (1 g). Both growth and quantity of tabtoxin synthesized were significantly affected by carbon source, nitrogen source, and amino acid supplements. Sorbitol, xylose, and sucrose proved to be the best carbon sources for tabtoxin production. Specific toxin production was very low using glucose as a single carbohydrate source, although bacterial growth was well supported by glucose. Amount and type of nitrogen sources (NH_{4}Cl or KNO_{3}) affected the growth of pv. tabaci and quantities of tabtoxin produced. Nitrate is the best of these two forms of nitrogen for production of tabtoxin.

Some progress has been made on elucidating factors that regulate tabtoxin biosynthesis in P. syringae.

=== Bioactivation ===
Zinc was shown to be required for the aminopeptidase activity, which hydrolyzes tabtoxin to release TβL.
