= Torcetrapib =

Names
- Preferred IUPAC name Ethyl (2R,4S)-4-({[3,5-bis(trifluoromethyl)phenyl]methyl}(methoxycarbonyl)amino)-2-ethyl-6-(trifluoromethyl)-3,4-dihydroquinoline-1(2H)-carboxylate

Identifiers
CAS Number	262352-17-0
3D model (JSmol)	Interactive image
ChEBI	CHEBI:49203
ChEMBL	ChEMBL479527
ChemSpider	140123
ECHA InfoCard	100.216.319
KEGG	D06195
PubChem CID	159325
UNII	4N4457MV2U
CompTox Dashboard (EPA)	DTXSID20180873
- InChI: InChI=1S/C26H25F9N2O4/c1-4-18-12-21(19-11-15(24(27,28)29)6-7-20(19)37(18)23(39)41-5-2)36(22(38)40-3)13-14-8-16(25(30,31)32)10-17(9-14)26(33,34)35/h6-11,18,21H,4-5,12-13H2,1-3H3/t18-,21+/m1/s1 Key: CMSGWTNRGKRWGS-NQIIRXRSSA-N; InChI=1/C26H25F9N2O4/c1-4-18-12-21(19-11-15(24(27,28)29)6-7-20(19)37(18)23(39)41-5-2)36(22(38)40-3)13-14-8-16(25(30,31)32)10-17(9-14)26(33,34)35/h6-11,18,21H,4-5,12-13H2,1-3H3/t18-,21+/m1/s1 Key: CMSGWTNRGKRWGS-NQIIRXRSBY
- SMILES: FC(F)(F)c1cc(cc(c1)C(F)(F)F)CN(C(=O)OC)[C@@H]3c2c(ccc(c2)C(F)(F)F)N(C(=O)OCC)[C@@H](C3)CC

Properties
Chemical formula	C_{26}H_{25}F_{9}N_{2}O_{4}
Molar mass	600.473
- Except where otherwise noted, data are given for materials in their standard state (at 25 °C [77 °F], 100 kPa). verify (what is ?) Infobox references

Torcetrapib (CP-529,414, Pfizer) was a drug being developed to treat hypercholesterolemia (elevated cholesterol levels) and prevent cardiovascular disease. Its development was halted in 2006 when phase III studies showed excessive all-cause mortality in the treatment group receiving a combination of atorvastatin (Lipitor) and torcetrapib.

== Medical uses ==
Torcetrapib has not been found to reduce either cardiovascular disease or risk of death in those already taking a statin drug.

== Mechanism ==
Torcetrapib acts (as a CETP inhibitor) by inhibiting cholesterylester transfer protein (CETP), which normally transfers cholesterol from HDL cholesterol to very low density or low density lipoproteins (VLDL or LDL). Inhibition of this process results in higher HDL cholesterol levels and reduces LDL cholesterol levels. According to Harvard Heart Letter: "HDL cholesterol is turning out to be a much more complex substance than we once believed. Instead of a single kind of particle, HDL cholesterol is a family of different particles. Although they all contain lipids (fats), cholesterol, and proteins called apolipoproteins, some types are spherical while others are doughnut-shaped. Some types of HDL are great at plucking cholesterol from LDL and artery walls while other types are indifferent to cholesterol, and some even transfer cholesterol the wrong way — into LDL and cells"

== Development ==
The first step in the synthesis was a recently created reaction of amination to p-chlorotrifluoryltoluene, a reaction that was created by Dr. Stephen Buchwald at MIT.

Development of the drug began around 1990; it was first administered in humans in 1999, and manufacturing at production scale began in Ireland in 2005.

Pfizer had previously announced that torcetrapib would be sold in combination with Pfizer's statin, atorvastatin (Lipitor); however, following media and physician criticism, Pfizer had subsequently planned for torcetrapib to be sold independently of Lipitor.

== Clinical trials ==
A 2004 trial (19 subjects, non-randomised) showed that torcetrapib could increase HDL and lower LDL with and without an added statin.

Nine phase III studies were completed.

=== Early termination of study ===
On December 2, 2006, Pfizer cut off torcetrapib's phase III trial because of "an imbalance of mortality and cardiovascular events" associated with its use. This was a sudden and unexpected event and as late as November 30, 2006 Jeff Kindler, Pfizer's chief executive, was quoted, "This will be one of the most important compounds of our generation." In the terminated trial, a 60% increase in deaths was observed among patients taking torcetrapib and atorvastatin versus taking atorvastatin alone. Pfizer recommended that all patients stop taking the drug immediately.

Six studies were terminated early. One of the completed studies found it raised systolic blood pressure and concluded "Torcetrapib showed no clinical benefit in this or other studies, and will not be developed further."

The drug cost $800m+ to bring into Phase III development.

== Synthesis ==
Dietary cholesterol needs be esterified in order to be absorbed from the gut. The enzyme, cholesterylester transfer protein (CETP), then completes the absorption of cholesterol. Drugs that interfere with the action of these peptides would aid in lowering cholesterol levels by complementing the action of the statins that inhibit the endogenous production of cholesterol. The CETP inhibitor torcetrapib (8) proved very effective in lowering cholesterol levels in humans; the drug not only lowered low-density lipoproteins (LDL and VLDL) but also raised levels of high density lipoproteins (HDL). This agent, which had only a brief time on the market due to adverse safety reports, is included here to illustrate an unusual method for preparing tetrahydroquinolines.

Torcetrapib synthesis: U.S. patent 6,313,142 Also see:

Reaction of the trifluoromethylaniline (1) with propanal in the presence of benzotriazole (2) affords the aminal (3). Condensation of (3) with the vinyl carbamate (4) yields the tetrahydroquinoline ring (5) with expulsion of the benzotriazole fragment. The ring nitrogen is then protected as its ethyl carbamate by acylation with ethyl chloroformate (6). The benzyl carbamate function on nitrogen at the 4 position is next removed by reduction with ammonium formate over palladium to afford the primary amine; this compound is then resolved as its dibenzyl tartrate salt to afford the 2R,4S isomer (7). Reductive amination with the bis-trifuoromethyl benzaldehyde in the presence of sodium triacetoxyborohydride followed by acylation with methyl chloroformate completes the synthesis of torcetrapib (8).

== See also ==
- CETP inhibitor
- Anacetrapib, CETP inhibitor undergoing development by Merck
- Dalcetrapib, CETP inhibitor which also failed in clinical trials
