= SLC22A7 =

Protein-coding gene in the species Homo sapiens

Identifiers
- Aliases: SLC22A7, NLT, OAT2, solute carrier family 22 member 7, hOAT11
- External IDs: OMIM: 604995; MGI: 1859559; GeneCards: SLC22A7

Gene location (Human)
Chr.	Chromosome 6 (human)
Band	6p21.1	Start	43,295,694 bp
Band	6p21.1	End	43,305,538 bp

Gene location (Mouse)
Chr.	Chromosome 17 (mouse)
Band	17|17 C	Start	46,743,109 bp
Band	17|17 C	End	46,749,383 bp
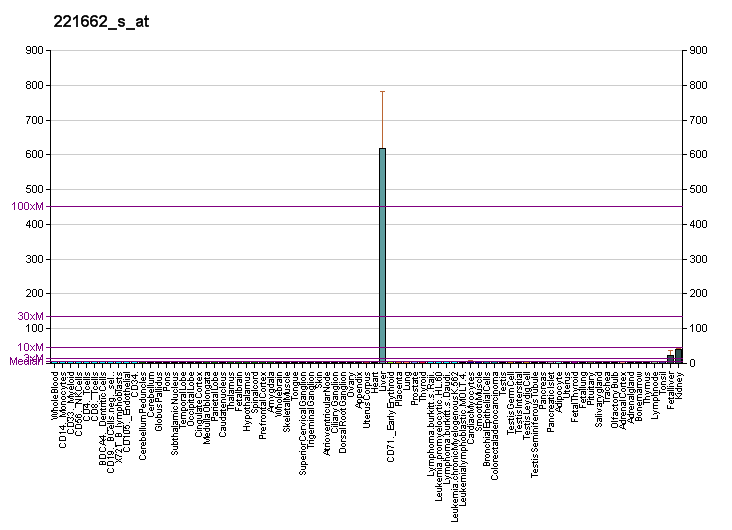

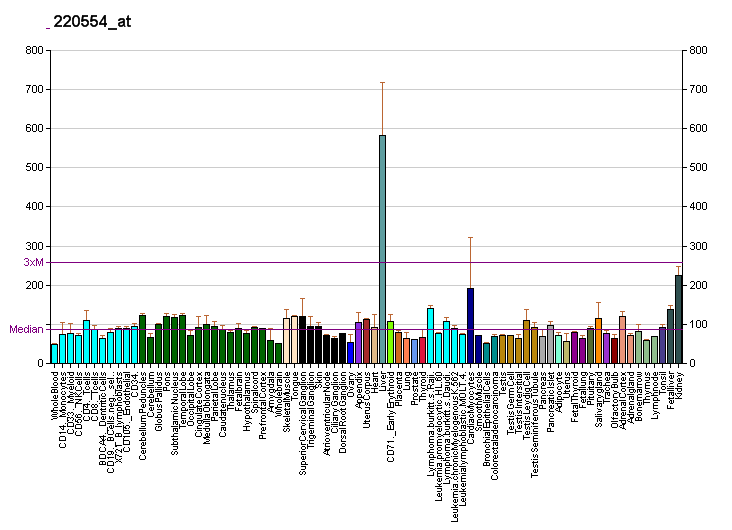

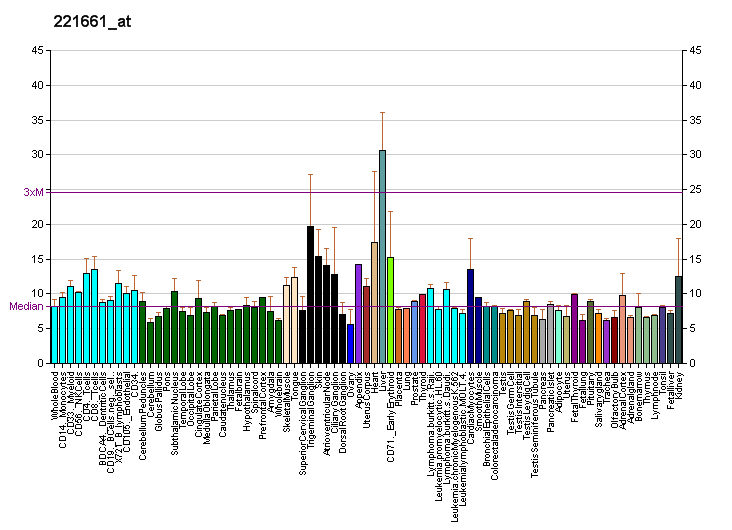
RNA expression pattern
Bgee	Human / Mouse (ortholog); Top expressed in: right lobe of liver; kidney tubule; renal medulla; vena cava; olfactory bulb; glomerulus; metanephric glomerulus; human kidney; right testis; Skeletal muscle tissue of rectus abdominis / Top expressed in: right kidney; human kidney; left lobe of liver; proximal tubule; embryo; embryo; morula; convoluted tubule; proximal convoluted tubule; thymus; More reference expression data
BioGPS	More reference expression data
Gene ontology
Molecular function	organic anion transmembrane transporter activity; protein binding; inorganic anion exchanger activity; sodium-independent organic anion transmembrane transporter activity
Cellular component	integral component of membrane; plasma membrane; basolateral plasma membrane; integral component of plasma membrane; membrane
Biological process	ion transport; organic anion transport; transmembrane transport; anion transmembrane transport; inorganic anion transport; sodium-independent organic anion transport
Sources:Amigo / QuickGO
Orthologs
Databases	NCBI: entry; OMA: entry
Species	Human	Mouse
Entrez	10864	108114
Ensembl	ENSG00000137204	ENSMUSG00000067144
UniProt	Q9Y694; Q5T051	Q91WU2
RefSeq (mRNA)	NM_006672; NM_153320	NM_144856
RefSeq (protein)	NP_006663; NP_696961	NP_659105
Location (UCSC)	Chr 6: 43.3 – 43.31 Mb	Chr 17: 46.74 – 46.75 Mb
PubMed search
- Wikidata
View/Edit Human	View/Edit Mouse

Solute carrier family 22 member 7 is a protein that in humans is encoded by the gene SLC22A7.

The protein encoded by this gene is involved in the sodium-independent transport and excretion of organic anions, some of which are potentially toxic. The encoded protein is an integral membrane protein and appears to be localized to the basolateral membrane of the kidney. Alternatively spliced transcript variants encoding different isoforms have been described.

== Interactive pathway map ==
Click on genes, proteins and metabolites below to link to respective articles. (Note: The interactive pathway map can be edited at WikiPathways: "FluoropyrimidineActivity_WP1601".)

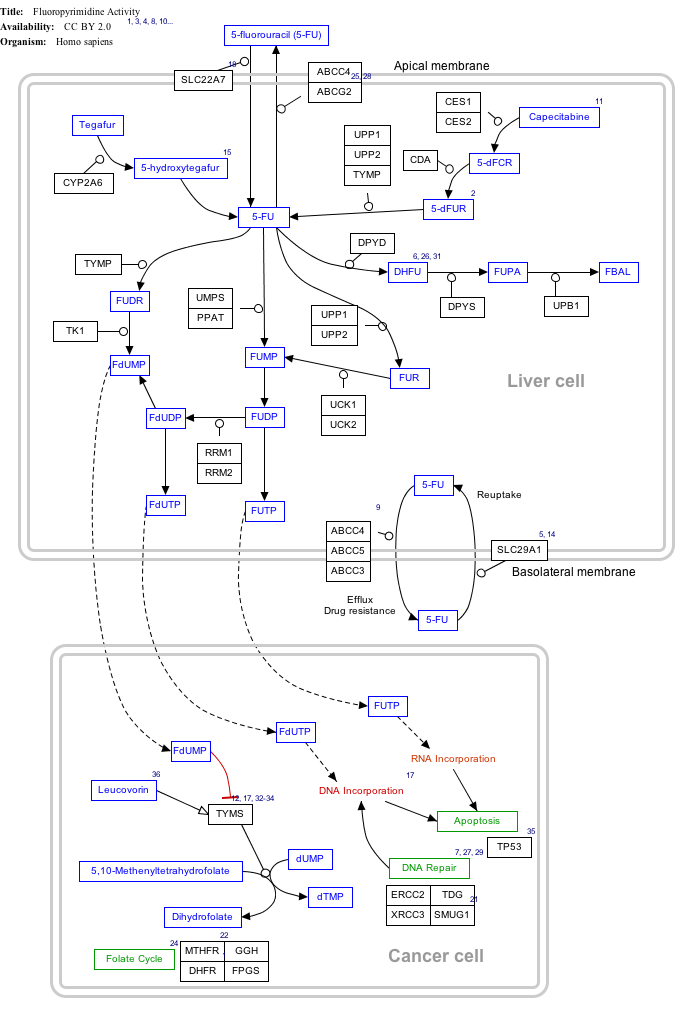

Fluorouracil (5-FU) Activity edit

== See also ==
- SLC22A7+protein,+human at the U.S. National Library of Medicine Medical Subject Headings (MeSH)
