= Obicetrapib =

Chemical compound

Clinical data
- Trade names: Ubeslo
- Other names: TA-8995; AMG-899
- ATC code: None

Legal status
- Legal status: EU: Rx-only

Identifiers
- IUPAC name: 4-[2-[[3,5-bis(trifluoromethyl)phenyl]methyl-[(2R,4S)-1-ethoxycarbonyl-2-ethyl-6-(trifluoromethyl)-3,4-dihydro-2H-quinolin-4-yl]amino]pyrimidin-5-yl]oxybutanoic acid
- CAS Number: 866399-87-3
- PubChem CID: 11498596
- DrugBank: DB14890
- ChemSpider: 9673402
- UNII: 8O74K609HN
- KEGG: D12900
- ChEMBL: ChEMBL3785197

Chemical and physical data
- Formula: C_{32}H_{31}F_{9}N_{4}O_{5}
- Molar mass: 722.609 g·mol^{−1}
- 3D model (JSmol): Interactive image
- SMILES: CC[C@@H]1C[C@@H](C2=C(N1C(=O)OCC)C=CC(=C2)C(F)(F)F)N(CC3=CC(=CC(=C3)C(F)(F)F)C(F)(F)F)C4=NC=C(C=N4)OCCCC(=O)O
- InChI: InChI=1S/C32H31F9N4O5/c1-3-22-14-26(24-13-19(30(33,34)35)7-8-25(24)45(22)29(48)49-4-2)44(28-42-15-23(16-43-28)50-9-5-6-27(46)47)17-18-10-20(31(36,37)38)12-21(11-18)32(39,40)41/h7-8,10-13,15-16,22,26H,3-6,9,14,17H2,1-2H3,(H,46,47)/t22-,26+/m1/s1; Key:NRWORBQAOQVYBJ-GJZUVCINSA-N

Obicetrapib, sold under the brand name Ubeslo, is used for the treatment of dyslipidemia. It is a CETP inhibitor. Obicetrapib is a lipid-modifying agent that blocks a blood protein called CETP, thereby lowering the level of LDL cholesterol.

The most common side effects include hypertension, dizziness, headache, diarrhea, and abdominal pain.

== Medical uses ==
Obicetrapib is indicated in adults with primary hypercholesterolemia (heterozygous familial and non familial) or mixed dyslipidemia, as an adjunct to diet in combination with a statin or statin with other lipid lowering therapies in people unable to reach low density lipoprotein cholesterol (LDL C) goals with the maximum tolerated dose of a statin; or alone or in combination with other lipid-lowering therapies in people who are statin intolerant, or for whom a statin is contraindicated.

== History ==
Obicetrapib was initially developed by Amgen as AMG-899 and was abandoned in 2017. In 2020, Amgen licensed the drug to NewAmsterdam Pharma. In 2022, NewAmsterdam Pharma licensed the drug to Menarini Group.

In a clinical trial, as an add-on to statins, compared with placebo, it decreased concentrations of LDL-C (by up to 51%), apolipoprotein B (by up to 30%) and non-high-density lipoprotein cholesterol (non-HDL-C) (by up to 44%), and increased HDL-C concentration (by up to 165%).

Obicetrapib's ability to lower LDL cholesterol (“bad” cholesterol) compared with placebo was observed in two 52-week, randomized, double-blind, placebo-controlled studies in adults with high cholesterol and/or mixed dyslipidemia who were already receiving the maximum tolerated cholesterol-lowering treatment.

== Society and culture ==
=== Legal status ===
Obicetrapib was authorized for medical use in the European Union in September 2026.

=== Names ===
Obicetrapib is the International nonproprietary name.

Obicetrapib is sold under the brand name Ubeslo.
