= Phytotoxin =

Class of toxins found in plants

Phytotoxins are substances that are poisonous or toxic to plants.

The term is also used to describe toxic chemicals produced by plants themselves, which function as defensive agents against their predators. Most examples pertaining to this definition of phytotoxin are members of various classes of specialised or secondary metabolites, including alkaloids, terpenes, and especially phenolics, though not all such compounds are toxic or serve defensive purposes. Phytotoxins may also be toxic to humans.

== Toxins produced by plants ==
=== Alkaloids ===
Alkaloids are derived from amino acids, and contain nitrogen. They are medically important by interfering with components of the nervous system affecting membrane transport, protein synthesis, and enzyme activities. They generally have a bitter taste. Alkaloids usually end in -ine (caffeine, nicotine, cocaine, morphine, ephedrine).

=== Terpenes ===
Terpenes are made of water-insoluble lipids, and synthesized from acetyl-CoA or basic intermediates of glycolysis They often end in -ol (menthol) and comprise the majority of plant essential oils.

- Monoterpenes are found in gymnosperms and collect in the resin ducts and may be released after an insect begins to feed to attract the insect's natural enemies.
- Sesquiterpenes are bitter tasting to humans and are found on glandular hairs or subdermal pigments.
- Diterpenes are contained in resin and block and deter insect feeding. Taxol, an important anticancer drug is found in this group.
- Triterpenes mimic the insect molting hormone ecdysone, disrupting molting and development and is often lethal. They are usually found in citrus fruit, and produce a bitter substance called limonoid that deters insect feeding.
- Glycosides are made of one or more sugars combined with a non-sugar like aglycone, which usually determines the level of toxicity. Cyanogenic glycosides are found in many plant seeds like cherries, apples, and plums. Cyanogenic glycosides produce cyanide and are extremely poisonous. Cardenolides have a bitter taste and influence NA+/K+ activated ATPases in human heart, they may slow or strengthen the heart rate. Saponins have lipid- and water-soluble components with detergent properties. Saponins form complexes with sterols and interfere with their uptake.

=== Phenolics ===
Phenolics are made of a hydroxyl group bonded to an aromatic hydrocarbon. Furanocoumarin is a phototoxic phenolic, and is non-toxic until activated by light. Furanocoumarin blocks the transcription and repair of DNA. Tannins are another group of phenolics important in tanning leather. Lignins, also a group of phenolics, are the most common compounds on Earth, and help conduct water in plant stems and fill spaces in the cell.

== Substances toxic to plants ==
=== Herbicides ===
Herbicides usually interfere with plant growth and often imitate plant hormones.

- ACCase Inhibitors kill grasses and inhibit the first step in lipid synthesis, acetyl-CoA carboxylase, thus affecting cell membrane production in the meristems. They do not affect dicots plants.
- ALS Inhibitors affect grasses and dicots by inhibiting the first step in some amino acid synthesis, acetolactate synthesis. The plants are slowly starved of these amino acids and eventually DNA synthesis stops.
- ESPS Inhibitors affect grasses and dicots by inhibiting the first step in the synthesis of tryptophan, phenylalanine and tyrosine, enolpyruvylshikimate 3-phosphate synthase enzyme.
- Photosystem II Inhibitors reduce the electron flow from water to NADPH^{2+} causing electrons to accumulate on chlorophyll molecules and excess oxidation to occur. The plant will eventually die.
- Synthetic Auxin mimics plant hormones and can affect the plant cell membrane.

=== Bacterial phytotoxins ===
- Tabtoxin is produced by Pseudomonas syringae pv. tabaci that may cause toxic concentrations of ammonia to build up. This buildup of ammonia causes leaf chlorosis.
- Glycopeptides are produced by a number of bacteria and have been indicated in disease development. A glycopeptide from Corynebacterium sepedonicum causes rapid wilt and marginal necrosis. A toxin from Corynebacterium insidiosum causes plugging of the plant stem interfering with water movement between cells. Amylovorin is a polysaccharide from Erwinia amylovora and causes wilting in rosaceous plants. A polysaccharide from Xanthomonas campestris obstructs water flow through phloem causing black rot in cabbage.
- Phaseolotoxin is a modified tripeptide [Nδ-(N′-sulfodiaminophosphinyl)-ornithyl-alanyl-homoarginine] produced by certains strains of Pseudomonas syringae pv. phaseolicola, Pseudomonas syringae pv. actinidiae and strain Pseudomonas syringae pv. syringae CFBP 3388. Phaseolotoxin is a reversible inhibitor of the enzyme ornithine carbamoyltransferase (OCTase; EC 2.1.3.3), which catalyzes the formation of citrulline from ornithine and carbamoylphosphate in the arginine biosynthetic pathway. Phaseolotoxin is an effective inhibitor of OCTase activity from plant, mammalian, and bacterial sources and causes a phenotypic requirement for arginine. Additionally, phaseolotoxin inhibits the enzyme ornithine decarboxylase (EC 4.1.1.17), which is involved in the biosynthesis of polyamines.
- Rhizobiotoxine, produced by Rhizobium japonicum, causes the root nodules of some soy bean plants to become chlorotic.

== See also ==
- Toxalbumin – Toxic plant proteins
- Phytotoxicity – Toxic effect by a compound on plant growth
