= Anacetrapib =

Names
- Preferred IUPAC name (4S,5R)-5-[3,5-Bis(trifluoromethyl)phenyl]-3-{[4′-fluoro-2′-methoxy-5′-(propan-2-yl)-4-(trifluoromethyl)[1,1′-biphenyl]-2-yl]methyl}-4-methyl-1,3-oxazolidin-2-one
- Other names MK-0859

Identifiers
CAS Number	875446-37-0
3D model (JSmol)	Interactive image
ChEMBL	ChEMBL1800807
ChemSpider	9731205
KEGG	D08855
PubChem CID	11556427
UNII	P7T269PR6S
CompTox Dashboard (EPA)	DTXSID90236452
- InChI: InChI=1S/C30H25F10NO3/c1-14(2)22-11-23(25(43-4)12-24(22)31)21-6-5-18(28(32,33)34)9-17(21)13-41-15(3)26(44-27(41)42)16-7-19(29(35,36)37)10-20(8-16)30(38,39)40/h5-12,14-15,26H,13H2,1-4H3/t15-,26-/m0/s1 Key: MZZLGJHLQGUVPN-HAWMADMCSA-N; InChI=1/C30H25F10NO3/c1-14(2)22-11-23(25(43-4)12-24(22)31)21-6-5-18(28(32,33)34)9-17(21)13-41-15(3)26(44-27(41)42)16-7-19(29(35,36)37)10-20(8-16)30(38,39)40/h5-12,14-15,26H,13H2,1-4H3/t15-,26-/m0/s1 Key: MZZLGJHLQGUVPN-HAWMADMCBN
- SMILES: O=C2O[C@H](c1cc(cc(c1)C(F)(F)F)C(F)(F)F)[C@@H](N2Cc4c(c3cc(c(F)cc3OC)C(C)C)ccc(c4)C(F)(F)F)C

Properties
Chemical formula	C_{30}H_{25}F_{10}NO_{3}
Molar mass	637.51 g·mol^{−1}
- Except where otherwise noted, data are given for materials in their standard state (at 25 °C [77 °F], 100 kPa). verify (what is ?) Infobox references

Anacetrapib is a CETP inhibitor which was being developed to treat elevated cholesterol levels in an effort to prevent cardiovascular disease. In 2017 its development was abandoned by Merck.

== Evidence ==
In 2017 REVEAL trial anacetrapib was shown to decrease the risk of repeat heart attacks in high-risk patients with previous acute coronary events.

== See also ==
Other CETP inhibitors:

- Torcetrapib was developed by Pfizer until December 2006 but caused unacceptable increases in blood pressure and had net cardiovascular detriment.
- Dalcetrapib was developed by Hoffmann–La Roche until May 2012. It did not raise blood pressure and did raise HDL, but it showed no clinically meaningful efficacy.
- Evacetrapib was developed by Eli Lilly and Company until October 2015.
