= Monobactam =

Monocyclic β-lactam antibiotics

Aztreonam
- Drug class
- Aztreonam. (The four-membered ring at the bottom is the β-lactam. There is a second thiazole ring, but it is not fused to the β-lactam ring.)

Class identifiers
- Use: Bacterial infection
- ATC code: J01DF

External links
- MeSH: D008997

Legal status

Tigemonam

Monobactams are bacterially-produced monocyclic β-lactam antibiotics. The β-lactam ring is not fused to another ring, in contrast to most other β-lactams.

Monobactams are narrow-spectrum antibiotics effective only against (strictly or facultatively) aerobic gram-negative bacilli and some gram-negative cocci, exhibiting a high level of resistance to beta-lactamases of these organisms. Due to their narrow spectrum, monobactams can be used to treat infections by susceptible bacteria without disrupting the patient's microbiota. Monobactams are nevertheless seldom used.

Aztreonam is the archetypal monobactam. Other monobactams include tigemonam, nocardicin A, carumonam and tabtoxin. An example of a monobactam that lacks antibiotic activity, but is used clinically for other purposes, is the cholesterol absorption inhibitor ezetimibe which is used to treat hypercholesterolemia.

== Pharmacology ==
Monobactams exert their antibacterial effects by binding to penicillin-binding proteins (PBPs), thereby inhibiting bacterial wall synthesis. Monobactams exhibit poor affinity for PBPs of Gram-positive bacteria as well as of strictly anaerobic bacteria, resulting in a lack of significant antimicrobial activity against these kinds of organisms. Monobactams are synergetic with aminoglycosides, and piperacillin.

Bacterial resistance to monobactams have been observed, and is mediated by bacterial beta-lactamases.

== Adverse effects ==
Adverse effects to monobactams can include skin rash and occasional abnormal liver functions.

Monobactam antibiotics exhibit no IgE cross-reactivity reactions with penicillin but have shown some cross reactivity with cephalosporins, most notably ceftazidime, which contains an identical side chain as aztreonam. Monobactams can trigger seizures in patients with history of seizures, although the risk is lower than with penicillins.

== Research ==
Siderophore-conjugated monobactams show promise for the treatment of multi drug-resistant pathogens.
