= Cholesterol absorption inhibitor =

Drug class

Cholesterol absorption inhibitors are a class of compounds that prevent the uptake of cholesterol from the small intestine into the circulatory system. Most of these molecules are monobactams but show no antibiotic activity. An example is ezetimibe (SCH 58235) Another example is Sch-48461. The "Sch" is for Schering-Plough, where these compounds were developed. Phytosterols are also cholesterol absorption inhibitors.

Viscous soluble fiber is available in foods or fiber supplements and can reduce LDL-C. It is hypothesized that this effect is by binding to bile acids and preventing their resorption. Psyllium reduces LDL-C by 0.33 mmol/l (12.5 mg/dl) and also reduces apolipoprotein B, leading one systematic review to conclude that it "effectively improves conventional and alternative lipids markers, potentially delaying the process of atherosclerosis-associated CVD risk in those with or without hypercholesterolemia". Another soluble fiber, konjac glucomannan, reduces LDL by 10 percent.

== Physiology ==
There are two sources of cholesterol in the upper intestine: dietary (from food) and biliary (from bile). Dietary cholesterol, in the form of lipid emulsions, combines with bile salts, to form bile salt micelles from which cholesterol can then be absorbed by the intestinal enterocyte.

Once absorbed by the enterocyte, cholesterol is reassembled into intestinal lipoproteins called chylomicrons. These chylomicrons are then secreted into the lymphatics and circulated to the liver. These cholesterol particles are then secreted by the liver into the blood as VLDL particles, precursors to LDL.

As a class, cholesterol absorption inhibitors block the uptake of micellar cholesterol, thereby reducing the incorporation of cholesterol esters into chylomicron particles. By reducing the cholesterol content in chylomicrons and chylomicron remnants, cholesterol absorption inhibitors effectively reduce the amount of cholesterol that is delivered back to the liver.

The reduced delivery of cholesterol to the liver increases hepatic LDL receptor activity and thereby increases clearance of circulating LDL. The net result is a reduction in circulating LDL particles.

== Importance ==
Managing cholesterol at the site of absorption is an increasingly popular strategy in the treatment of hypercholesterolemia. Cholesterol absorption inhibitors are known to have a synergistic effect when combined a class of antihyperlipidemics called statins, to achieve an overall serum cholesterol target. For statin-resistant or statin-sensitive populations that are characterized by low one-year compliance rates, such a combination therapy is proving to be especially effective.

== See also ==
- Ezetimibe (Zetia) - one of the most successfully selling drugs in this class
