= Dalcetrapib =

Names
- IUPAC name S-[2-({[1-(2-Ethylbutyl)cyclohexyl]carbonyl}amino)phenyl]-2-methylpropanethioate

Identifiers
CAS Number	211513-37-0
3D model (JSmol)	Interactive image; Interactive image
ChEMBL	ChEMBL313006
ChemSpider	5293737
ECHA InfoCard	100.250.741
KEGG	D09708
PubChem CID	6918540
UNII	3D050LIQ3H
CompTox Dashboard (EPA)	DTXSID70943475
- InChI: InChI=1S/C23H35NO2S/c1-5-18(6-2)16-23(14-10-7-11-15-23)22(26)24-19-12-8-9-13-20(19)27-21(25)17(3)4/h8-9,12-13,17-18H,5-7,10-11,14-16H2,1-4H3,(H,24,26) Key: YZQLWPMZQVHJED-UHFFFAOYSA-N; InChI=1/C23H35NO2S/c1-5-18(6-2)16-23(14-10-7-11-15-23)22(26)24-19-12-8-9-13-20(19)27-21(25)17(3)4/h8-9,12-13,17-18H,5-7,10-11,14-16H2,1-4H3,(H,24,26) Key: YZQLWPMZQVHJED-UHFFFAOYAR
- SMILES: O=C(Sc1ccccc1NC(=O)C2(CC(CC)CC)CCCCC2)C(C)C; CCC(CC)CC1(CCCCC1)C(=O)NC2=CC=CC=C2SC(=O)C(C)C

Properties
Chemical formula	C_{23}H_{35}NO_{2}S
Molar mass	389.60 g·mol^{−1}
- Except where otherwise noted, data are given for materials in their standard state (at 25 °C [77 °F], 100 kPa). Infobox references

Dalcetrapib (INN, development code JTT-705) is a CETP inhibitor which was originally being developed by F. Hoffmann–La Roche until May 2012. DalCor Pharmaceuticals licensed dalcetrapib as a potential pioneering precision medicine for patients with cardiovascular disease. By combining genetic and clinical insights into the development program, dalcetrapib is intended to reduce fatal and non-fatal myocardial infarction (MI) following a recent acute coronary syndrome (ACS) and deliver superior cardiovascular outcome in a specific genetic subset of patients. A companion diagnostic test, developed in conjunction with Roche Diagnostics, identifies patients with the specific genotype, AA genotype at variant rs1967309 in the adenylate cyclase type 9 (ADCY9), who may potentially benefit from dalcetrapib treatment.

The drug was initially aimed at raising the blood levels of HDL cholesterol. Prevailing observations indicate that high HDL-C levels correlate with better overall cardiovascular health, though it remains unclear whether pharmacologically raising HDL-C levels consequently leads to a benefit in cardiovascular health.

F. Hoffmann-La Roche conducted the dal-OUTCOMES phase III trial which was halted in 2012 “due to a lack of clinically meaningful efficacy.” The results of dal-OUTCOMES were published in November 2012.Subsequently, a pharmacogenomic genome-wide association study (GWAS) conducted by the Montreal Heart Institute reported that patients from the dal-OUTCOMES study bearing a protective allele, the AA genotype, at SNP rs1967309 in the ADCY9 gene may have benefited from dalcetrapib therapy. Changes in inflammation and cholesterol efflux capacity observed in these patients may in part explain the benefits associated with the protective genotype. These findings led to DalCor Pharmaceuticals conducting dal-GenE and Dal-GenE-2 trials.

DalCor is currently conducting the Dal-GenE-2 confirmatory trial with dalcetrapib and placebo in North America under a Special Protocol Assessment (SPA) agreement with the U.S. Food and Drug Administration (FDA).

Dal-GenE-2 (Dal-302), a phase III, double-blind, randomized placebo-controlled study, will evaluate the potential of dalcetrapib to reduce the occurrence of fatal and non-fatal myocardial infarction (MI) in approximately 2,000 patients with a documented recent acute coronary syndrome (ACS) and the AA genotype at variant rs1967309 in the ADCY9 gene.

Based on a genetic discovery from a study called dal-OUTCOMES, that suggested patients with a recent acute coronary syndrome and a specific AA genotype in a gene called ADCY9 may gain a potential benefit for future cardiovascular events such as heart attack and stroke, a study called Dal-GenE trial was performed by DalCor Pharmaceuticals to validate these observations. This specific AA genotype is carried by approximately 20% of the total population and up to 40% in people of African descent.

Dal-GenE was a randomized placebo-controlled study to evaluate the effects of dalcetrapib versus placebo on cardiovascular risk in patients with a recent acute coronary syndrome bearing this potentially protective AA genotype. Eligible patients were optimally treated for their cardiovascular risk factors such as diabetes, hypertension and elevated LDL cholesterol. The prespecified primary endpoint was time-to-first event for the composite of cardiovascular death, resuscitated cardiac arrest, non- fatal myocardial infarction (MI) or non-fatal stroke.

The results published in 2022 showed that dalcetrapib did not significantly reduce the risk of occurrence of the primary endpoint of ischaemic cardiovascular events at end of study in patients with an acute coronary syndrome within 1–3 months of randomization and the AA genotype at variant rs1967309 in the ADCY9 gene.However, the results of the dal-GenE trial showed a 21% relative risk reduction (RRR) in fatal and non-fatal MI in 6,149 patients across 34 countries, and a 45% RRR for the same endpoint in 1,200 patients in North America and further confirmed the safety profile of dalcetrapib.

== See also ==
- CETP inhibitor
