= NPC1L1 =

Mammalian protein found in Homo sapiens

Identifiers
- Aliases: NPC1L1, NPC11L1, NPC1 like intracellular cholesterol transporter 1, SLC65A2, LDLCQ7
- External IDs: OMIM: 608010; MGI: 2685089; GeneCards: NPC1L1
Available structures
PDB	Ortholog search: PDBe RCSB
PDB	List of PDB id codes 3QNT

Gene location (Human)
Chr.	Chromosome 7 (human)
Band	7p13	Start	44,512,535 bp
Band	7p13	End	44,541,330 bp

Gene location (Mouse)
Chr.	Chromosome 11 (mouse)
Band	11|11 A1	Start	6,161,013 bp
Band	11|11 A1	End	6,180,143 bp
RNA expression pattern
Bgee	Human / Mouse (ortholog); Top expressed in: jejunal mucosa; duodenum; right lobe of liver; testicle; islet of Langerhans; gallbladder; muscle layer of sigmoid colon; right coronary artery; Descending thoracic aorta; popliteal artery / Top expressed in: epithelium of small intestine; jejunum; ileum; duodenum; migratory enteric neural crest cell; embryo; Paneth cell; morula; blastocyst; yolk sac; More reference expression data
BioGPS	n/a
Gene ontology
Molecular function	myosin V binding; protein binding
Cellular component	membrane; plasma membrane; brush border membrane; apical plasma membrane; cytoplasmic vesicle membrane; cytoplasmic vesicle; integral component of membrane; spanning component of plasma membrane
Biological process	lipoprotein metabolic process; steroid metabolic process; lipid metabolism; cholesterol transport; cholesterol metabolic process; intestinal cholesterol absorption; cholesterol biosynthetic process; intestinal lipid absorption; cellular response to sterol depletion
Sources:Amigo / QuickGO
Orthologs
Databases	NCBI: entry; OMA: entry
Species	Human	Mouse
Entrez	29881	237636
Ensembl	ENSG00000015520	ENSMUSG00000020447
UniProt	Q9UHC9	Q6T3U4
RefSeq (mRNA)	NM_001101648; NM_001300967; NM_013389	NM_207242
RefSeq (protein)	NP_001095118; NP_001287896; NP_037521	n/a
Location (UCSC)	Chr 7: 44.51 – 44.54 Mb	Chr 11: 6.16 – 6.18 Mb
PubMed search
- Wikidata
View/Edit Human	View/Edit Mouse

Niemann-Pick C1-Like 1 (NPC1L1) is a protein found on the gastrointestinal tract's epithelial cells as well as in hepatocytes. Specifically, it appears to bind to a critical mediator of cholesterol absorption.

The drug ezetimibe inhibits NPC1L1 causing a reduction in cholesterol absorption, resulting in a blood cholesterol reduction of 15-20%. Polymorphic variations in the NPC1L1 gene could be associated with non-response to ezetimibe treatment. One study found that people with inactivating mutations in the NPC1L1 gene had a lower LDL cholesterol level, as well as an around 50% reduction in the risk of coronary heart disease.

NPC1L1 has been shown to be an accessory receptor for hepatitis C virus entry into cells, and thus ezetimibe might be used as a therapeutic strategy.

As cancer appeared more frequently in patients treated with simvastatin-ezetimibe combination therapy in one clinical trial, it had been hypothesized that NPC1L1 inhibition by ezetimibe might be associated with an increased cancer risk. However, a meta-analysis of ezetimibe clinical data showed no increase in the risk of cancer from treatment with ezetimibe.
