= Eravacycline =

Names
- Preferred IUPAC name (4S,4aS,5aR,12aS)-4-(Dimethylamino)-7-fluoro-3,10,12,12a-tetrahydroxy-1,11-dioxo-9-[2-(pyrrolidin-1-yl)acetamido]-1,4,4a,5,5a,6,11,12a-octahydrotetracene-2-carboxamide
- Other names Xerava

Identifiers
CAS Number	1207283-85-9
3D model (JSmol)	Interactive image
ChemSpider	28495485
KEGG	D10369; D10421
PubChem CID	54726192
UNII	07896928ZC
- InChI: InChI=1S/C27H31FN4O8/c1-31(2)20-13-8-11-7-12-14(28)9-15(30-16(33)10-32-5-3-4-6-32)21(34)18(12)22(35)17(11)24(37)27(13,40)25(38)19(23(20)36)26(29)39/h9,11,13,20,34,36-37,40H,3-8,10H2,1-2H3,(H2,29,39)(H,30,33)/t11-,13-,20-,27-/m0/s1 Key: HLFSMUUOKPBTSM-ISIOAQNYSA-N
- SMILES: CN(C)[C@H]1[C@@H]2C[C@@H]3CC4=C(C=C(C(=C4C(=O)C3=C([C@@]2(C(=O)C(=C1O)C(=O)N)O)O)O)NC(=O)CN5CCCC5)F

Properties
Chemical formula	C_{27}H_{31}FN_{4}O_{8}
Molar mass	558.555

Pharmacology
ATC code	J01AA13 (WHO)
Legal status	EU: Rx-only
- Except where otherwise noted, data are given for materials in their standard state (at 25 °C [77 °F], 100 kPa). Infobox references

Eravacycline (TP-434, Xerava) is a synthetic halogenated tetracycline class antibiotic by Tetraphase Pharmaceuticals. It is closely related to tigecycline. It has a broad spectrum of activity including many multi-drug resistant strains of bacteria. Phase III studies in complicated intra-abdominal infections (cIAI) and complicated urinary tract infections (cUTI) were recently completed with mixed results. Eravacycline was granted fast track designation by the FDA and is currently available in USA.

== Medical uses ==
Eravacycline has shown broad spectrum of activity against a variety of Gram-positive and Gram-negative bacteria, including multi-drug resistant strains, such as methicillin-resistant Staphylococcus aureus (MRSA) and carbapenem-resistant Enterobacteriaceae. It is currently being formulated as for intravenous and oral administration.

=== Spectrum of activity ===
==== Gram-positive organisms ====
- Staphylococcus aureus (both methicillin-resistant and sensitive strains)
- Streptococcus pneumoniae
- Enterococcus faecalis
- Enterococcus faecium (including vancomycin resistant strains)

==== Gram-negative organisms ====
- Acinetobacter baumannii
- Stenotrophomonas maltophilia
- Haemophilus influenzae
- Moraxella catarrhalis
- Neisseria gonorrhoeae
- Enterobacteriaceae
  - Escherichia coli (including ESBL-producing strains)
  - Klebsiella pneumoniae (including carbapenem resistant strains)
  - Klebsiella oxytoca
  - Enterobacter species
  - Citrobacter species
  - Proteus mirabilis
  - Serratia marcescens

Similar to other tetracycline derivatives, eravacycline is poorly active against Pseudomonas aeruginosa with a MIC_{90} = 16 mcg/mL (range 0.06-64 mcg/mL). Eravacycline maintains in-vitro activity against Enterobacteriaceae carrying the mcr-1 gene responsible for polymyxin b/colistin resistance.

== Clinical trials ==
Current and past clinical trial information:

=== Phase 3 trials ===
==== Complicated Intra-abdominal infections (IGNITE 1) ====
The IGNITE 1 trial compared twice-daily IV eravacycline to once-daily ertapenem for the treatment of cIAI. A total of 541 patients were included and eravacycline demonstrated noninferiority to ertapenem. An additional pivotal phase 3 study (IGNITE 4) is planned for late 2016 with initial results likely available in the fourth quarter of 2017.

==== Complicated Intra-abdominal Infections (IGNITE 4) ====
IGNITE 4 assessed twice-daily intravenous eravacycline (1.0 mg/kg every 12 hours) compared to those receiving meropenem (1 g every 8 hours). The study enrolled 500 adult patients with the primary endpoint being clinical response at the test-of-cure visit which is 25–31 days after initial dosing. Primary efficiency analysis was conducted using a 12.5% non-inferiority margin in the microbiological intent-to-treat (micro-ITT) population.

In July 2017, Tetraphase pharmaceuticals released top line data via press showing clinical cure rates in the micro-ITT population to be 90.8% and 91.2% for eravacycline (n=195) and meropenem (n=205), respectively (95% CI: -6.3%, 5.3%). Primary analysis was conducted using a 12.5% non-inferiority margin of the modified intent-to-treat (MITT) and clinically evaluable (CE) patient populations. Clinical cure rates in the MITT population were 92.4% and 91.6% for eravacycline (n=250) and meropenem (n=249), respectively (95% CI: -4.1%, 5.8%). Clinical cure rates in the CE population were 96.9% and 96.1% for eravacycline (n=225) and meropenem (n=231), respectively (95% CI: -2.9%, 4.5%). Eravacycline met the primary efficacy endpoints according to the FDA and EMA guidelines. The secondary analyses were consistent with, and supportive of, the primary outcome according to Tetraphase. There were no treatment-related serious adverse events (SAEs) in the trial. Treatment-emergent adverse event (TEAEs) rates were similar in both treatment groups with the most commonly reported drug-related adverse events (AEs) for eravacycline were infusion site reactions, nausea and vomiting, each occurring at a rate of less than 5%. The most common Gram-negative pathogens in the study included Escherichia coli, Klebsiella pneumoniae, Pseudomonas and Bacteroides. Full data from IGNITE4 will become available as the company prepares to submit its New Drug Application (NDA) in the first quarter of 2018 for Eravacycline treatment of Complicated Intra-abdominal Infections.

==== Complicated Urinary Tract infections (IGNITE 2) ====
The IGNITE 2 trial compared 7 days of IV eravacycline to IV levofloxacin with the option to convert patients in either group to oral therapy after 3 days for cUTI. Overall, eravacycline was inferior to levofloxacin in response rate (60.4 vs 66.9%); however it was noted that patients who completed therapy with the IV formulation had higher response rates, suggesting formulation issues with the oral option. Due to the performance of the IV formulation, an additional phase 3 trial is planned to support a supplemental NDA for the cUTI indication.

===== Complicated Urinary Tract Infections (IGNITE 3) =====
IGNITE3 is currently ongoing starting January 2017 with expected completion December 2018. This study is evaluating IV eravacycline (1.5 mg/kg every 24 hours) compared to ertapenem (1 g every 24 hours) for the treatment of cUTI. IGNITE3 is currently enrolling approximately 1,000 patients who will be randomized 1:1 to receive intravenous eravacycline or ertapenem for a minimum of 5 days, and will then be eligible for transition to oral levofloxacin. The primary endpoints are Proportion of Participants in the microbiological Intent-to-treat (micro-ITT) Population demonstrating Clinical Cure and Microbiologic Success at the End of Intravenous (EOI) Visit [Time Frame: EOI visit (within 1 day of the completion of intravenous study drug treatment)] & Proportion of Participants in the micro-ITT Population Demonstrating Clinical Cure and Microbiologic Success at the Test-Of-Cure (TOC) Visit [Time Frame: TOC visit (14–17 days after randomization)]. With secondary endpoints (outcomes) testing Proportion of Participants in the microbiological Modified Intent-To-Treat (micro-MITT) Population and the Microbiologically Evaluable (ME) Population Demonstrating Microbiologic Success at the TOC Visit [Time Frame: TOC visit (14–17 days after randomization)]

== Commercial information ==
Eravacycline is under development by Tetraphase Pharmaceuticals Inc. It is marketed under trade name Xerava in United States.
