= Polymyxin =

Group of antibiotics

Colistin

Polymyxin B (R=H is polymyxin B2, R=CH_{3} is polymyxin B1)

Polymyxins are antibiotics. Polymyxins B and E (also known as colistin) are used in the treatment of Gram-negative bacterial infections. They work mostly by breaking up the bacterial cell membrane. They are part of a broader class of molecules called nonribosomal peptides.

They are produced in nature by Gram-positive bacteria such as Paenibacillus polymyxa.

== Medical use ==
Polymyxin antibiotics are relatively neurotoxic and nephrotoxic, so are usually used only as a last resort if modern antibiotics are ineffective or are contraindicated. Typical uses are for infections caused by strains of multiple drug-resistant Pseudomonas aeruginosa or carbapenemase-producing Enterobacteriaceae. Polymyxins have less effect on Gram-positive organisms, and are sometimes combined with other agents (as with trimethoprim/polymyxin) to broaden the effective spectrum.

Polymyxins B are not absorbed from the gastrointestinal tract, so they are only administered orally if the goal is to disinfect the GI tract. Another route of administration is chosen for systemic treatment, e.g., parenteral (often intravenously) or by inhalation. They are also used externally as a cream or drops to treat otitis externa (swimmers ear), and as a component of triple antibiotic ointment to treat and prevent skin infections.

== Mechanism of action ==
After binding to lipopolysaccharide (LPS) in the outer membrane of Gram-negative bacteria, polymyxins disrupt both the outer and inner membranes. The hydrophobic tail is important in causing membrane damage, suggesting a detergent-like mode of action.

Removal of the hydrophobic tail of polymyxin B yields polymyxin nonapeptide, which still binds to LPS, but no longer kills the bacterial cell. However, it still detectably increases the permeability of the bacterial cell wall to other antibiotics, indicating that it still causes some degree of membrane disorganization.

Gram-negative bacteria can develop resistance to polymyxins through various modifications of the LPS structure that inhibit the binding of polymyxins to LPS.

Antibiotic resistance to this drug has been increasing, especially in southern China. Recently the gene mcr-1, which confers the antibiotic resistance, has been isolated from bacterial plasmids in Enterobacteriaceae.

== Chemistry ==
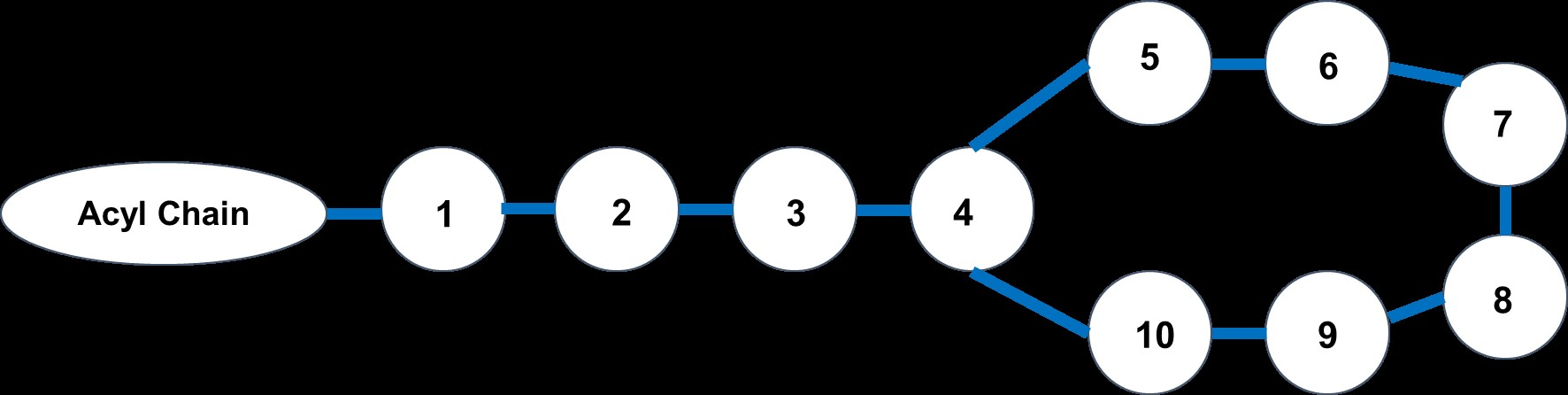
Numbers denote sequence of amino acid loading.

Polymyxins are a group of cyclic non-ribosomal polypeptide (NRPs) which are biosynthesized by bacteria belonging to the genus Paenibacillus. Polymyxins consist of 10 amino acid residues, six of which are L-α,γ-diaminobutyric acid (L-DAB). The DAB residues cause polymyxins to have multiple positively charged groups at physiological pH. Seven amino acid residues form the main cyclic component, while the other three extend from one of the cyclic residues as a linear chain terminating in either 6-methyloctanoic acid or 6-methylheptanoic acid at the N-terminus. During cyclization, residue 10 is bound to the bridging residue 4. The amino acid residues and DAB monomers are generally in the L (levo) configuration, however certain strains such as P. polymyxa PKB1 have been observed to incorporate DAB with the D (dextro) configuration at position 3 producing variations of polymyxin B.

Polymyxin M is also known as "mattacin".

=== Biosynthesis ===
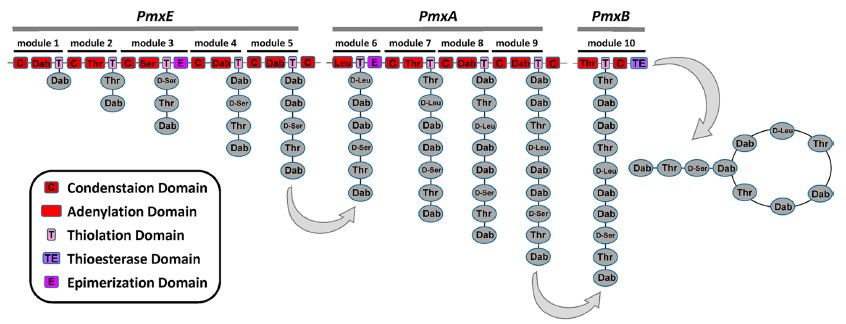

The polymyxins are produced by nonribosomal peptide synthetase systems in Gram-positive bacteria such as Paenibacillus polymyxa. Like other NRPs, polymyxins are assembled by synthetases with multiple modules, each containing a set of enzyme domains that sequentially operate on the growing chain by adding the next residue and extending the chain through peptide-bond formation and condensation reactions. The final steps involve a thioesterase domain at the C-terminal of the last module to cyclize the molecule and liberate the chain from the enzyme.

== Research ==
Polymyxins are used to neutralize or absorb LPS contaminants in samples, for example in immunological experiments. Minimization of LPS contamination can be important because LPS can evoke strong reactions from immune cells, distorting experimental results.

By increasing permeability of the bacterial membrane system, polymyxin is also used in clinical work to increase the release of secreted toxins, such as Shiga toxin, from Escherichia coli.

The global problem of advancing antimicrobial resistance has led to a renewed interest in their use.

=== Compound mixtures in Polymyxin B drug ===
In formulations for the commercial pharmaceutical Polymyxin drug, the principal Polymyxins are B1 and B2, amounting to 75% and 15% of the final mixture, respectively. Polymyxin B1, in turn, comprises several isomers, like isoleucine-polymyxin B1 and B1-1. The major impediment in the purification and isolation of one isomer is due to the minimal structural differences between Polymyxin B1 and B2, differing only in one carbon at the 6th position of the fatty acyl side chain linked to the D-Phenylalanine of the structure. Polymyxin B1 contains 6-methyl octanoic acid, while Polymyxin B2 contains 6-methyl heptanoic acid. Similarly, Polymyxins B3 and B4 also differ at this position, with B3 containing octanoic acid and B4 featuring heptanoic acid.

== See also ==
- Polysporin
- Neosporin
- Lysis
