= Asad Ullah Khan =

Indian microbiologist, biochemist, and professor

- Born: Badaun, India
- Education: Aligarh Muslim University; International Centre for Genetic Engineering and Biotechnology; Rutgers University
- Known for: Discovery of Aligarh super bug in India
- Awards: 2020 Om Prakash Bhasin Award for Science and Technology; 2020 Visitor's award 2019; 2014 AMU Outstanding Research Award; 2012 N-BIOS Prize; 2011 DBT CREST Award; 2010 AMU Active Teacher Award; 2009 AMI-ALEMBIC Award; 2006 AMI Young Scientist Award
- Scientific career
- Fields: Biochemistry; Microbiology
- Workplaces: Aligarh Muslim University

Asad Ullah Khan is an Indian microbiologist, biochemist and a professor at the Interdisciplinary Biotechnology Unit of the Aligarh Muslim University. He is known for his studies on multidrug resistant clinical strains as well as for the first sighting in India of Aligarh super bug (NDM-4), a variant of New Delhi metallo-beta-lactamase 1 (NDM-1). He is an elected fellow of the Royal Society of Chemistry, the Biotech Research Society, India and the Indian Academy of Microbiological Sciences. The Department of Biotechnology of the Government of India awarded him the National Bioscience Award for Career Development, one of the highest Indian science awards, for his contributions to biosciences, in 2012.

== Biography ==
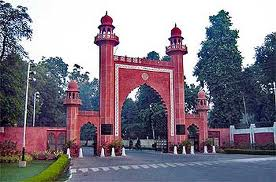
Entrance to Aligarh Muslim University

Dr. Asad Ullah Khan did his undergraduate studies in chemistry and post-graduate studies in biotechnology at the Aligarh Muslim University (AMU) after which he pursued his doctoral studies at the International Centre for Genetic Engineering and Biotechnology, New Delhi to secure a PhD in biochemistry from Aligarh Muslim University. He started his career as a lecturer at AMU in 1997 and during his career there, he did his post-doctoral studies at Rutgers University during 2000–03. He returned to India to resume his career at AMU where he holds the position of a professor and the coordinator of the Biotechnology Unit.

== Professional profile ==
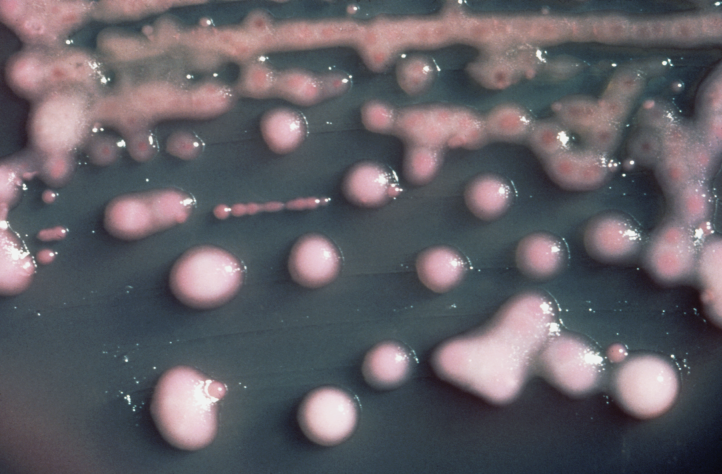
Klebsiella pneumoniae, the bacterium in which NDM-1 was first identified

Khan's research focus is on developing new inhibitors against multidrug resistant clinical strains with special interest on extended spectrum beta lactamases (ESBL) such as NDM-1 and CTX-M, using QSARR modeling and structure-based virtual screening methods. The team led by him collect Escherichia coli and Klebsiella pneumoniae strains from hospital and community-acquired infection sites and it was during one of those explorations that he discovered a variant of New Delhi metallo-beta-lactamase 1 named NDM-4, more commonly known as Aligarh super bug, in the sewage drains of Jawaharlal Nehru Medical College, Aligarh, in 2014. This was the first recorded sighting of the antibiotic-resistant super bug in India; (Note: New Delhi metallo-beta-lactamase 1 was the first in the series of NDM super bugs and was detected in a Swedish patient in New Dehi in 2009,) the finding was later disclosed by Khan in an article published in the Journal of Medical Microbiology. Later, Khan and his colleagues developed a protocol for detecting super bugs and was successful in sequencing the genes of three variants of NDM-1. His studies have been documented by way of a number of articles (Note: Please see Selected bibliography section) and ResearchGate, an online repository of scientific articles has listed 241 of them. Besides he has also edited three books. Khan is a member of the scientific committee of the Indian Academy of Biomedical Sciences and sits in the advisory board of the Sir Syed Global Scholar Award (SSGSA) committee. He is an associate editor of BMC Microbiology for their section on Clinical microbiology and vaccines and is a member of the Task Force on Bioinformatics, Computational and Systems Biology of the Department of Biotechnology. He has also conducted workshops and seminars on the subject.

== Awards and honors ==
Recipient of Sri Om Prakash Bhasin Award-2019 and visitor's Award 2019 for his trail-blazing research in Biotechnology; The Association of Microbiologists of India (AMI) awarded Khan the Young Scientist Award in 2006; AMI honored him again in 2009 with the Alembic Award. He received the Most Active Teacher Award from Aligarh Muslim University in 2010 and the Cutting-Edge Research Enhancement and Scientific Training (CREST) Award of the Department of Biotechnology in 2011. The Department of Biotechnology (DBT) of the Government of India awarded him the National Bioscience Award for Career Development, one of the highest Indian science awards in 2012. When Aligarh Muslim University instituted the Outstanding Research Award in 2014, he was the first recipient of the award.

Khan was elected as a fellow by the Royal Society of Chemistry in 2017. He is also an elected fellow of the Biotech Research Society, India and the Indian Academy of Microbiological Sciences and the various research fellowships he has received include University Grants Commission fellowship (1995–98), Boyscast fellowship of the Department of Science and Technology (2004–05) and the visiting fellowship of the Indian National Science Academy (2006–07).

== Selected bibliography ==
- Zuberi, Azna; Ahmad, Nayeem; Khan, Asad U (2017). "CRISPRi Induced Suppression of Fimbriae Gene (fimH) of a Uropathogenic Escherichia coli: An Approach to Inhibit Microbial Biofilms". Frontiers in Immunology. 8: 1552. doi:10.3389/fimmu.2017.01552. PMC 5694031. PMID 29181009.
- Khan, Asad U; Ali, Abid; Danishuddin; Srivastava, Gaurava; Sharma, Ashok (2017). "Potential inhibitors designed against NDM-1 type metallo-β-lactamases: An attempt to enhance efficacies of antibiotics against multi-drug-resistant bacteria". Scientific Reports. 7 (1): 9207. Bibcode:2017NatSR...7.9207K. doi:10.1038/s41598-017-09588-1. PMC 5569068. PMID 28835636.
- Zaidi, Sahar; Misba, Lama; Khan, Asad U (2017). "Nano-therapeutics: A revolution in infection control in post antibiotic era". Nanomedicine: Nanotechnology, Biology and Medicine. 13 (7): 2281–2301. doi:10.1016/j.nano.2017.06.015. PMID 28673854.
- Zuberi, Azna; Misba, Lama; Khan, Asad U (2017). "CRISPR Interference (CRISPRi) Inhibition of luxS Gene Expression in E. Coli: An Approach to Inhibit Biofilm". Frontiers in Cellular and Infection Microbiology. 7: 214. doi:10.3389/fcimb.2017.00214. PMC 5445563. PMID 28603699.
- Ahmad, Nayeem; Ali, Syed Manazir; Khan, Asad U (2017). "First reported New Delhi metallo-β-lactamase-1-producing Cedecea lapagei". International Journal of Antimicrobial Agents. 49 (1): 118–119. doi:10.1016/j.ijantimicag.2016.10.001. PMID 28244375.
- Liu, Yi-Yun; Wang, Yang; Walsh, Timothy R; Yi, Ling-Xian; Zhang, Rong; Spencer, James; Doi, Yohei; Tian, Guobao; Dong, Baolei; Huang, Xianhui; Yu, Lin-Feng; Gu, Danxia; Ren, Hongwei; Chen, Xiaojie; Lv, Luchao; He, Dandan; Zhou, Hongwei; Liang, Zisen; Liu, Jian-Hua; Shen, Jianzhong (2016). "Emergence of plasmid-mediated colistin resistance mechanism MCR-1 in animals and human beings in China: A microbiological and molecular biological study". The Lancet Infectious Diseases. 16 (2): 161–168. doi:10.1016/S1473-3099(15)00424-7. PMID 26603172.
- Danishuddin; Khan, Asad U (2016). "Descriptors and their selection methods in QSAR analysis: Paradigm for drug design". Drug Discovery Today. 21 (8): 1291–1302. doi:10.1016/j.drudis.2016.06.013. PMID 27326911.
- Khan, Asad U; Rehman, M. Tabish (2016). "Role of Non-Active-Site Residue Trp-93 in the Function and Stability of New Delhi Metallo-β-Lactamase 1". Antimicrobial Agents and Chemotherapy. 60 (1): 356–360. doi:10.1128/AAC.01194-15. PMC 4704196. PMID 26525789.
- Khan, Shahper N; Khan, Asad U (2016). "Breaking the Spell: Combating Multidrug Resistant 'Superbugs'". Frontiers in Microbiology. 7: 174. doi:10.3389/fmicb.2016.00174. PMC 4757689. PMID 26925046.
- Rehman, Md Tabish; Shamsi, Hira; Khan, Asad U (2014). "Insight into the Binding Mechanism of Imipenem to Human Serum Albumin by Spectroscopic and Computational Approaches". Molecular Pharmaceutics. 11 (6): 1785–1797. doi:10.1021/mp500116c. PMID 24745377.
- Hasan, Sadaf; Danishuddin, Mohd; Khan, Asad U (2015). "Inhibitory effect of zingiber officinale towards Streptococcus mutans virulence and caries development: In vitro and in vivo studies". BMC Microbiology. 15 (1): 1. doi:10.1186/s12866-014-0320-5. PMC 4316655. PMID 25591663.
- Danishuddin, Mohd; Khan, Asad U (2015). "Structure based virtual screening to discover putative drug candidates: Necessary considerations and successful case studies". Methods. 71: 135–145. doi:10.1016/j.ymeth.2014.10.019. PMID 25448480.
- Hasan, Sadaf; Danishuddin, Mohd; Khan, Asad U (2015). "Inhibitory effect of zingiber officinale towards Streptococcus mutans virulence and caries development: In vitro and in vivo studies". BMC Microbiology. 15 (1): 1. doi:10.1186/s12866-014-0320-5. PMC 4316655. PMID 25591663.
- Kulshrestha, Shatavari; Khan, Shakir; Meena, Ramovatar; Singh, Braj R; Khan, Asad U (2014). "A graphene/zinc oxide nanocomposite film protects dental implant surfaces against cariogenic Streptococcus mutans". Biofouling. 30 (10): 1281–1294. Bibcode:2014Biofo..30.1281K. doi:10.1080/08927014.2014.983093. PMID 25431994. S2CID 205606245.
- Khan, Asad; Khan; Azam; Alam (2012). "Gold nanoparticles enhance methylene blue– induced photodynamic therapy: A novel therapeutic approach to inhibit Candida albicans biofilm". International Journal of Nanomedicine. 7: 3245–57. doi:10.2147/IJN.S31219. PMC 3396389. PMID 22802686.
- Hasan, Sadaf; Singh, Kunal; Danisuddin, Mohd; Verma, Praveen K; Khan, Asad U (2014). "Inhibition of Major Virulence Pathways of Streptococcus mutans by Quercitrin and Deoxynojirimycin: A Synergistic Approach of Infection Control". PLOS ONE. 9 (3) e91736. Bibcode:2014PLoSO...991736H. doi:10.1371/journal.pone.0091736. PMC 3951425. PMID 24622055.
- Faheem, Mohammad; Rehman, Md Tabish; Danishuddin, Mohd; Khan, Asad U (2013). "Biochemical Characterization of CTX-M-15 from Enterobacter cloacae and Designing a Novel Non-β-Lactam-β-Lactamase Inhibitor". PLOS ONE. 8 (2) e56926. Bibcode:2013PLoSO...856926F. doi:10.1371/journal.pone.0056926. PMC 3578935. PMID 23437273.
- Khan, Shahper N; Danishuddin, Mohd; Varshney, Bhavna; Lal, Sunil K; Khan, Asad U (2012). "Inhibition of N-Terminal Lysines Acetylation and Transcription Factor Assembly by Epirubicin Induced Deranged Cell Homeostasis". PLOS ONE. 7 (12) e51850. Bibcode:2012PLoSO...751850K. doi:10.1371/journal.pone.0051850. PMC 3522591. PMID 23251640.
- Islam, B; Khan, S. N; Haque, I; Alam, M; Mushfiq, M; Khan, A. U (2008). "Novel anti-adherence activity of mulberry leaves: Inhibition of Streptococcus mutans biofilm by 1-deoxynojirimycin isolated from Morus alba". Journal of Antimicrobial Chemotherapy. 62 (4): 751–757. doi:10.1093/jac/dkn253. PMID 18565974.
- Zarrilli, R; Vitale, D; Di Popolo, A; Bagattini, M; Daoud, Z; Khan, A. U; Afif, C; Triassi, M (2008). "A Plasmid-Borne blaOXA-58 Gene Confers Imipenem Resistance to Acinetobacter baumannii Isolates from a Lebanese Hospital". Antimicrobial Agents and Chemotherapy. 52 (11): 4115–4120. doi:10.1128/AAC.00366-08. PMC 2573143. PMID 18725447.
- He, X (2003). "Functional interactions between the transcription and mRNA 3' end processing machineries mediated by Ssu72 and Sub1". Genes & Development. 17 (8): 1030–1042. doi:10.1101/gad.1075203. PMC 196040. PMID 12704082.
- Khan, Asad U; Hampsey, Michael (2002). "Connecting the DOTs: Covalent histone modifications and the formation of silent chromatin". Trends in Genetics. 18 (8): 387–389. doi:10.1016/S0168-9525(02)02746-4. PMID 12142001.

== See also ==
- New Delhi metallo-beta-lactamase 1
- Common multidrug-resistant organisms (MDROs)
