= Lipid A phosphoethanolamine transferase =

Enzyme

Identifiers
- EC no.: 2.7.8.43

Databases
- BRENDA: enzyme data
- ExPASy: NiceZyme view
- KEGG: enzyme entry
- MetaCyc: metabolic pathway
- Rhea: reactions
- PDB structures: RCSB PDB PDBe PDBsum
Search
- PMC: articles
- PubMed: articles
- NCBI: proteins

Lipid A phosphoethanolamine transferase

Identifiers
- Symbol: PEA_transferase
- InterPro: IPR040423
Available protein structures:
- PDB: IPR040423
- AlphaFold: IPR040423

Phosphoethanolamine transferase, N-terminal

Identifiers
- Symbol: EptA-like_N
- Pfam: PF08019
- InterPro: IPR012549
Available protein structures:
- PDB: IPR012549 PF08019 (ECOD; PDBsum)
- AlphaFold: IPR012549; PF08019

Lipid A phosphoethanolamine transferase (EC 2.7.8.43, lipid A PEA transferase, LptA, formerly EC 2.7.4.30) is an enzyme that modifies Lipid A by linkage to a phosphoethanolamine moiety. Doing so at some positions reduces the affinity to colistin and related polymyxins, resulting in reduced activity of the antimicrobial. This type of resistance is known as target modification. This type of enzyme is of special medical note, as it offers resistance to a last-resort antibiotic. The modifications also provide cross-resistance to host immunity factors, specifically antimicrobial peptides and lysozyme. EC 2.7.8.43 catalyzes one of the following three reactions:

- a 1,2-diacyl-sn-glycero-3-phosphoethanolamine + H(+) + lipid A (E. coli) $\rightleftharpoons$ a 1,2-diacyl-sn-glycerol + lipid A hexaacyl 1-(2-aminoethyl diphosphate)
- a 1,2-diacyl-sn-glycero-3-phosphoethanolamine + H(+) + lipid A (E. coli) $\rightleftharpoons$ a 1,2-diacyl-sn-glycerol + lipid A 4'-(2-aminoethyl diphosphate) (E. coli)
- a 1,2-diacyl-sn-glycero-3-phosphoethanolamine + H(+) + lipid A hexaacyl 1-(2-aminoethyl diphosphate) $\rightleftharpoons$ a 1,2-diacyl-sn-glycerol + lipid A 1,4'-bis(2-aminoethyl diphosphate)

Enzyme databases may list a very long list of synonyms for this enzyme. Many of these names, such as mcr-1, do not refer to this type of enzyme in general, but only to a specific member of the family. There are many non-mobile (chromosomal) versions of this enzyme scattered all around the evolutionary tree, but mcr-1 was notable because it was found on a plasmid, therefore capable of horizontal gene transfer. Only one family of protein is currently known to perform the activity described by the EC number.

== Structure ==
The enzyme is composed of two domains. The N-terminal part (about 1/3 of the length) is a transmembrane domain, while the rest is catalytic. Both domains contribute to the phosphoethanolamine substrate cavity. The C-terminal domain binds zinc as a cofactor.

== Function ==
Polymyxins and other cationic antimicrobial peptides attach to the LPS cell walls of bacteria by virtue of the highly negatively-charged groups in LPS such as Lipid A and Kdo. Modification of LPS with positively-charged PEA shields these sites from binding.

Not all members of this family perform the same reaction, contrary to the EC classification framework. For example, E. coli naturally has three related genes all from this family, EptA through C, all with different preferences for where to attach PEA. Addition of PEA can happen on Lipid A (this EC entry), on Kdo (EC 2.7.8.42), or on Heptose 1 (no EC number), the latter two being parts of the core oligosaccharide. In the case of EptC, addition of PEA to Heptose compacts the LPS by forming a network of hydrogen bonds.

== Regulation ==
In chromosomal versions of this enzyme, the gene is regulated by a two-component regulatory system termed PmrAB or BasRS. The PmrA or BasS is the histidine kinase sensor, which activates the DNA-binding response regulator BasR or PmrB. The sensor triggers in a variety of dangerous situations, such as metal ions and being ingested by a phagocyte, helping the bacterium build a stronger cell wall to survive. The PhoPQ system, which detects similar situations and the presence of antimicrobial peptides, can also cross-trigger PmrA via a PmrD connector. Antibiotic resistance can occur when this system, or its upstream signals, mutates to become constitutively active.

In plasmid versions, the gene is simply constitutively activated by an upstream promoter. The extra metabolic resources diverted means that the resistant trait is disadvantageous in environments without antibiotic or antimicrobial peptide threats, specifically by about 3%.

== See also ==
- MCR-1
