= Trimethoprim/polymyxin B =

Combination drug

Combination of
- Polymyxin B: Cell envelope antibiotic
- Trimethoprim: Nucleic acid inhibitor antibiotic

Clinical data
- Trade names: Polytrim
- Routes of administration: Topical eye drops
- ATC code: S01AA30 (WHO)

Legal status
- Legal status: US: ℞-only

Identifiers
- CAS Number: 103172-75-4
- PubChem CID: 24848162
- KEGG: D11086
- CompTox Dashboard (EPA): DTXSID60145683

Polymyxin B/trimethoprim, sold under the brand name Polytrim is an antimicrobial solution for topical ophthalmic use in the treatment of acute bacterial conjunctivitis and blepharoconjunctivitis.

In 2023, it was the 251st most commonly prescribed medication in the United States, with more than 1 million prescriptions.

== Medical uses ==
Polymyxin B/trimethoprim is indicated in the treatment of surface ocular bacterial infections, including acute bacterial conjunctivitis, and blepharoconjunctivitis, caused by susceptible strains of the following microorganisms: Staphylococcus aureus, Staphylococcus epidermidis, Streptococcus pneumoniae, Streptococcus viridans, Haemophilus influenzae, and Pseudomonas aeruginosa.
