= Xellia =

Pharmaceutical company in Denmark

Xellia ApS
- Type: Owned by Novo Holdings
- Industry: Pharmaceuticals, health care
- Founded: 1958
- Headquarters: Copenhagen, Denmark
- Website: http://www.xellia.com

Xellia ApS is a Danish multinational pharmaceutical and life sciences company headquartered in Copenhagen specialized in the production of anti-biotics, including Vancomycin and Bacitracin.

The company's U.S. base of operations was previously in Buffalo Grove, Illinois, with additional facilities in Ohio, and North Carolina. In 2018, Xellia's sales in the United States accounted for 60% of its total revenue. In 2024, Xellia sold portions of its U.S. business and related assets, including its Bedford, Ohio plant, to London-based generics maker Hikma Pharmaceuticals for $135 million in cash, plus an additional $50 million in contingent milestones. The closure of the Bedford plant resulted in over 200 employees permanently losing their jobs.

In 2025, Xellia announced plans to close its Copenhagen manufacturing facility, beginning with a transfer of production of vancomycin hydrochloride API, expected to be completed in 2028.

== Products ==
The company's main output is bulk drug chemicals which are wholesaled to other companies for packaging and distribution. Recently some prepackaged goods have been produced.

Active drug substances manufactured are:

ATC	Substance	Structural formula	Formulation for sale	Production started
D06AX05 (WHO) (FK); J01XX10 (WHO) (FK); R02AB04 (WHO) (FK); QA07AA93 (WHO) (FK)	Bacitracin (MT)		Bacitracin	1952
D06AX05 (WHO) (FK); J01XX10 (WHO) (FK); R02AB04 (WHO) (FK); QA07AA93 (WHO) (FK)	Bacitracin (MT)		Bacitracin zinc	1958
				Colistimethate natrium (CMS)
A07AA10 (WHO) (FK); J01XB01 (WHO) (FK); QJ51XB01 (WHO) (FK)	Colistin		Colistin sulfate	1969
J01X X09	Daptomycin (MT)		Daptomycin	
R02AB30 (WHO) (FK)			Gramicidin	
A07AA05 (WHO) (FK); J01XB02 (WHO) (FK); S01AA18 (WHO) (FK); S02AA11 (WHO) (FK); S03AA03 (WHO) (FK); QJ51XB02 (WHO) (FK)	Polymyxin B (MT)		Polymyxin B-sulfate	1968
J01GB01 (WHO) (FK); S01AA12 (WHO) (FK)	Tobramycin (MT)		Tobramycin sulfate	2005
D06AX08 (WHO) (FK); R02AB02 (WHO) (FK); S01AA05 (WHO) (FK)	Tyrothricin		Tyrothricin	
A07AA09 (WHO) (FK); J01XA01 (WHO) (FK)	Vancomycin (MT)		Vancomycin hydrochloride	2003
A01AB04 (WHO) (FK); A07AA07 (WHO) (FK); G01AA03 (WHO) (FK); J02AA01 (WHO) (FK)	Amfotericin B (MT)		Amfotericin B	1985
J02AX04 (WHO) (FK)	Caspofungin (MT)		Caspofungin acetate	
D07AC17 (WHO) (FK); R01AD08 (WHO) (FK); R01AD58 (WHO) (FK); R03BA05 (WHO) (FK)	Fluticasone (MT)		Fluticasone propionate	
D07AC13 (WHO) (FK); R01AD09 (WHO) (FK); R03BA07 (WHO) (FK)	Mometasone (MT)		Mometasone furoate	

=== Discontinued products ===
Previously the company also produced:

Ingredient	Produced
Neomycin	1952-?
Tetracycline	1961-?

== Partnerships ==
In 2019, Xellia partnered with Civica Rx to produce generic Vancomycin and Daptomycin. The partnership's stated aim is to remedy chronic drug shortages that have affected the American pharmaceutical market. In October 2026, Xellia entered into a partnership with Chinese pharmaceutical company Zhejiang Hisun Pharmaceutical to expand into the cardiovascular and oncology fields.

== China-US Trade War ==
Xellia has been discussed as a potential alternative to Chinese companies for anti-biotic primary ingredients in the context of the China-United States trade war.

== See also ==
- List of Danish companies
- List of pharmaceutical companies
