= Multidrug-resistant Gram-negative bacteria =

Gram-negative bacteria with resistance to multiple antibiotics

Multidrug resistant Gram-negative bacteria (MDRGN bacteria) are a type of Gram-negative bacteria with resistance to multiple antibiotics. They can cause bacteria infections that pose a serious and rapidly emerging threat for hospitalized patients and especially patients in intensive care units. Infections caused by MDR strains are correlated with increased morbidity, mortality, and prolonged hospitalization. Thus, not only do these bacteria pose a threat to global public health, but also create a significant burden to healthcare systems.

== Emerging threat ==
These bacteria pose a great threat to public health due to the limited treatment options available as well as lack of newly developed antimicrobial medications. MDR strains of Enterobacteriaceae, Pseudomonas aeruginosa, and Acinetobacter baumannii have become of most concern because they have been reported by hospitals all around the United States. There are many factors which could be contributed to the existence and spread of MDR gram-negative bacteria such as the: overuse or misuse of existing antimicrobial agents, which has led to the development of adaptive resistance mechanisms by bacteria; a lack of responsible antimicrobial stewardship such that the use of multiple broad-spectrum agents has helped perpetuate the cycle of increasing resistance; and a lack of good infection control practices.

== Treatment options ==
Although there is currently a shortage of new drugs in the antimicrobial realm, there are a few antibiotics currently being studied and tested for the treatment of serious Gram-negative bacterial infections. These include cephalosporins, ceftobiprole, ceftarolin and FR-264205. The lack of newly emerging antimicobrial drugs have resulted in the revisit of old antibiotic drugs such as colistin (Polymyxins) and fosfomycin, which are traditionally considered to be toxic but have gained a principal role in the treatment of the most problematic MDR Gram-negative pathogens including Pseudomonas aeruginosa, Acinetobacter baumannii, Klebsiella pneumoniae and Stenotrophomonas maltophilia. Also, there has been interest in the drug Tigecycline, which is from the class of antibiotics called glycylcyclines, for treating MDRGN infections. This drug shows promise in infections from multi-drug resistant K. pneumoniae (K. pneumoniae carbapenemase [KPC]- and ESBL-producing strains) and Enterobacteriaceae with various mechanisms of resistance. A review of investigational antibiotics shows that several new agents will become available in the coming years, even though the pace of antimicrobial research has proven far too slow.

Overuse of antimicrobial agents and problems with infection control practices have led to the development of multidrug-resistant gram-negative bacterial infections. We used to use carbapenems as the main option in several countries for those severe infections; however, now there are several mechanisms of resistance, including carbapenemase production among Acinetobacter, Pseudomonas, and Klebsiella isolates. Subsequently, carbapenems are sometimes not active against those serious infections. That is why clinicians around the world have reconsidered the use of older antimicrobial agents, including polymyxins. — Matthew Falagas, MD.

The above quote was taken from an interview by Luke F. Chen, at the Infectious Diseases Society of America 2010 Annual Meeting. A study of MDRGN in long-term care facilities, reported in 2010, concluded that patients with severe dementia who require assistance with the activities of daily life are at high risk of MDRGN co-colonization and may be the "super-spreaders" of MDRGN in these facilities.

== See also ==
- Antibiotic resistance
- Drug resistance
- Multiple drug resistance
