= MCR-1 =

Probable phosphoethanolamine transferase Mcr-1

Identifiers
- Organism: Escherichia coli
- Symbol: mcr1
- Orthologs: OMA: entry
- UniProt: A0A0R6L508
Search for
- Structures: Swiss-model
- Domains: InterPro

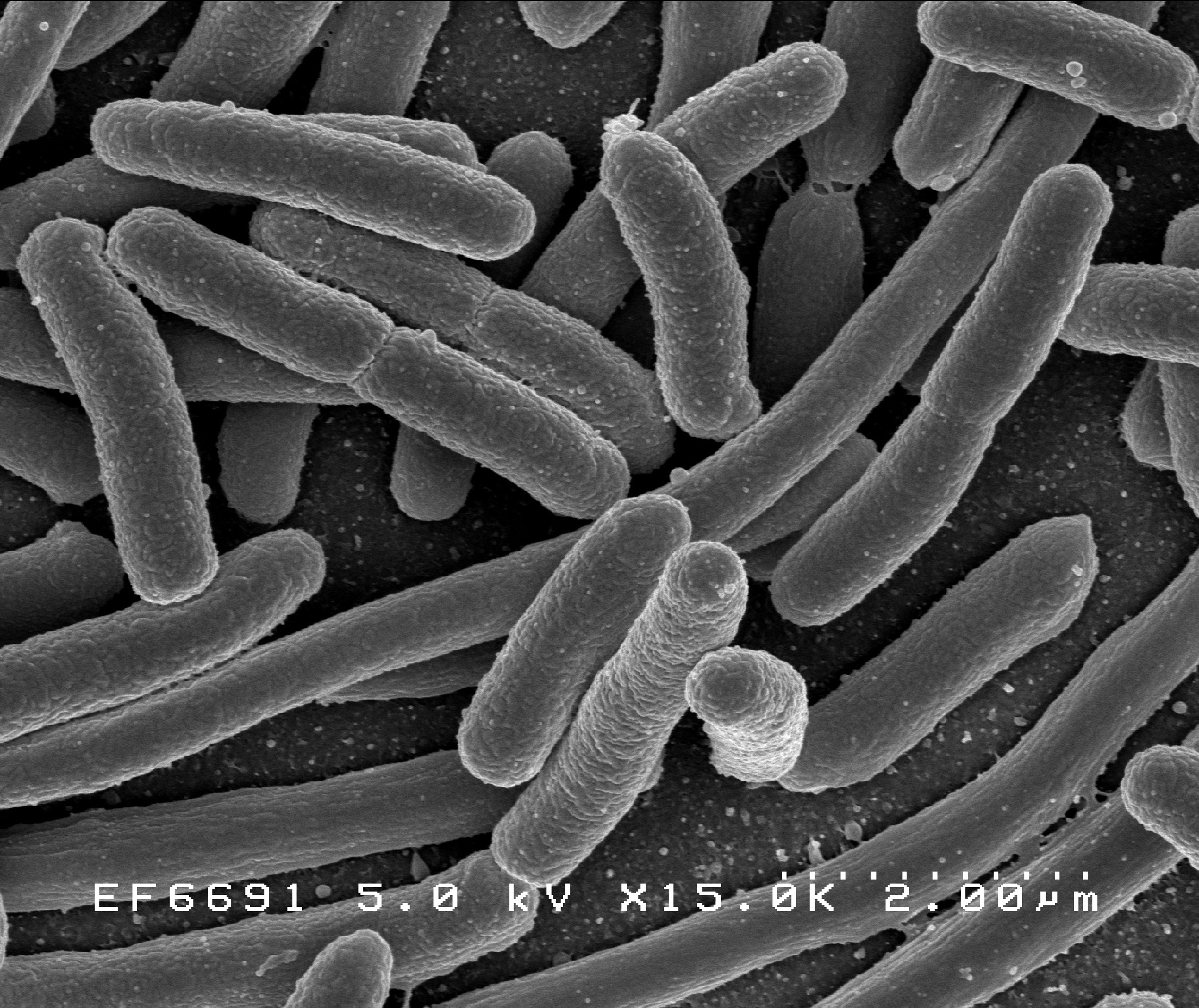
E. coli, the bacterium in which MCR-1 was first identified.

The mobilized colistin resistance (mcr) gene confers plasmid-mediated resistance to colistin, one of a number of last-resort antibiotics for treating Gram-negative infections. mcr-1, the original variant, is capable of horizontal transfer between different strains of a bacterial species. After discovery in November 2015 in E. coli (strain SHP45) from a pig in China it has been found in Escherichia coli, Salmonella enterica, Klebsiella pneumoniae, Enterobacter aerogenes, and Enterobacter cloacae. As of 2017, it has been detected in more than 30 countries on 5 continents in less than a year.

== Description ==
The "mobilized colistin resistance" (mcr-1) gene confers plasmid-mediated resistance to colistin, a polymyxin and one of a number of last-resort antibiotics for treating infections. The gene is found in no less than ten species of the Enterobacteriaceae: Escherichia coli, Salmonella, Klebsiella pneumoniae, Enterobacter aerogenes, Enterobacter cloacae, Cronobacter sakazakii, Shigella sonnei, Kluyvera species, Citrobacter species, and Raoultella ornithinolytica.

The mechanism of resistance of the MCR gene is a lipid A phosphoethanolamine transferase. The enzyme transfers a phosphoethanolamine residue to the lipid A present in the cell membrane of gram-negative bacteria. The altered lipid A has much lower affinity for colistin and related polymyxins resulting in reduced activity of the antimicrobial. This type of resistance is known as target modification. Although the same mechanism has been observed before with enzymes like eptA, mcr-1 is the first polymyxin resistance gene known to be capable of horizontal transfer between different strains of a bacterial species.

mcr-1 also provides resistance to host antimicrobial peptides. Bacteria carrying the gene were better at killing infected caterpillars.

== Discovery and geographical spread ==
The gene was first discovered in E. coli (strain SHP45) from a pig in China April 2011 and published in November 2015. It was identified by independent researchers in human samples from Malaysia, China, England, Scotland, and the United States.

In April 2016, a 49-year-old woman sought medical care at a Pennsylvania clinic for UTI symptoms. PCR of an E. coli isolate cultured from her urine revealed the mcr-1 gene for the first time in the United States, and the CDC sent an alert to health care facilities. In the following twelve months, four additional people were reported to have infections with mcr-1 carrying bacteria.

As of February 2017 mcr-1 has been detected in more than 30 countries on 5 continents in less than a year, and it appears to be spreading in hospitals in China. The prevalence in five Chinese provinces between April 2011 and November 2014 was 15% in raw meat samples and 21% in food animals during 2011–14, and 1% in people hospitalized with infection.

== Origins ==
Using genetic analysis, researchers believe that they have shown that the origins of the gene were on a Chinese pig farm where colistin was routinely used.

== Inhibition ==
Given the importance of mcr-1 in enabling bacteria to acquire polymyxin resistance, MCR-1 (the protein that is encoded by mcr-1) is a current inhibition target for the development of new antibiotic adjuvants. For example, ethylenediaminetetraacetic acid (EDTA), a metal-chelating agent and common food additive, was shown to inhibit MCR-1 as it is a zinc-dependent enzyme. Substrate analogues, such as ethanolamine and glucose, were also shown to inhibit MCR-1. The use of a combined antibiotics regime has shown to be able to overcome the resistance that is caused by mcr-1, and the mechanism of action may be directly or indirectly targeting the MCR-1 protein. Recently, a couple of studies showed that peptide nucleic acids (PNAs), a class of antisense molecules, when conjugated with cell-penetrating peptides, may inhibit the translation of MCR to turn off polymyxin resistance.

== Other mcr genes ==
As of April 2021, ten mobilized colistin resistance genes termed mcr-1 through mcr-10 have been identified. They are homologous to each other, and work in similar ways. The mcr-2 gene is a rare variant of mcr-1 and is found only in Belgium. The less-related mcr-3, mcr-4, and mcr-5 were identified in E. coli and Salmonella.

On the phylogenic tree, the various clusters of mcr genes are scattered between immobile resistance genes of the same type, suggesting a history of multiple transfer to plasmids.

== See also ==
- New Delhi metallo-beta-lactamase 1
