= Dispase =

Dispase is a protease which cleaves fibronectin, collagen IV, and to a lesser extent collagen I. It is found in some bacteria and can be isolated from culture filtrates of Bacillus polymyxa. It can be extracted, purified, and used in research. It can be particularly useful to separate embryonic epithelia and mesenchyme. Dispase II is specific for the cleavage of leucine-phenylalanine bonds.

Dispase is often used to digest adhering primary cells in culture, since this treatment turned out to be milder than trypsin digestion (Sinclair et al., 2013).

A recent article also finds that dispase can digest serine-phenylalanine.

Dispase intravitreal injection can be used in the modeling of proliferative vitreoretinopathy in different animals.
