= Cell envelope antibiotic =

Antibiotic

A cell envelope antibiotic is an antibacterial that acts primarily at the level of the cell envelope.

Examples include cycloserine, penicillin, and polymyxin B.
