= Heroic measure =

High-risk but last-resort medical attention

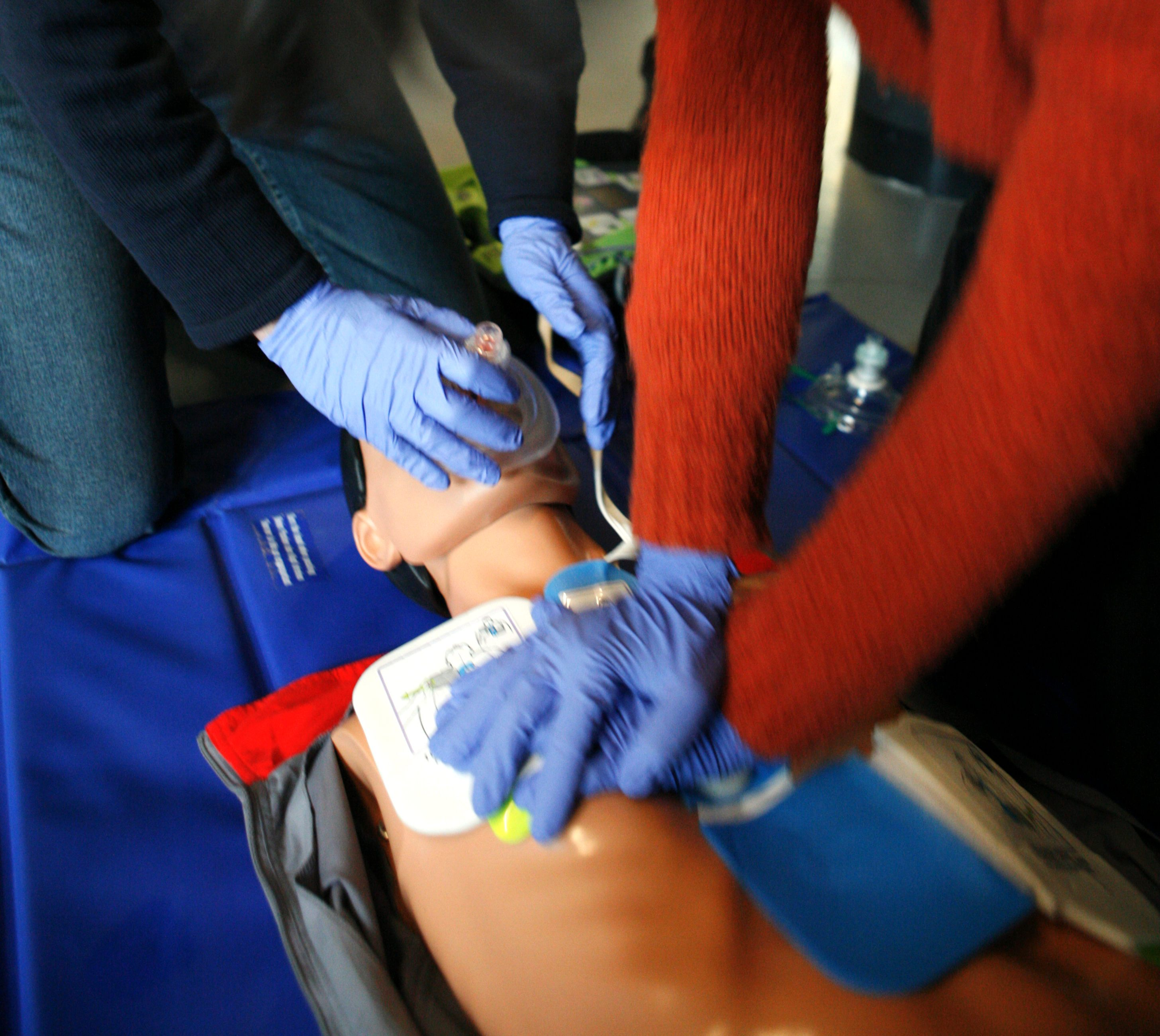
CPR is a common example of a heroic measure—performing it may result in injury but may also be necessary to save a person's life

In the context of medicine, heroic measures refer to any courses of treatment or therapy aimed at saving or prolonging a person's life, despite the potential harm those treatments may cause. Heroic measures are almost always used in the scenario of life-threatening situations, when all other viable treatment options have failed, or there is no better treatment option available. The term is not explicitly defined, but rather associated with other umbrella terms, such as advanced care planning and end-of-life care. In conversations, people may use other terms depending on the context, such as "a Hail Mary situation" to emphasize the desperate needs for such treatment.

== Examples ==
=== CPR ===
Cardiopulmonary resuscitation (CPR) serves as a popular example of a heroic measure. CPR is a potentially life-saving emergency procedure involving chest compressions and rescue breathing, used when a person's heart stops beating or they are not breathing. While CPR can be considered a standard of care in the healthcare setting, it is often seen as a last-ditch attempt to save a person's life in an emergency. If a person suffers cardiac arrest and is not near adequate medical attention, CPR can be seen as the only viable option to revive the person. Potential consequences of CPR include sternum fracture, rib fracture, lung contusion, artery rupture and hemorrhage, but nevertheless, CPR may be medically necessary when the alternative option is death.

=== Amputations ===
Amputations of limbs may be considered heroic measures, but necessary in situations which call for drastic measures. In the event that a limb gets physically crushed or is damaged beyond repair, the only way to save the patient may be to remove the affected limb. For example, persons with diabetes are at risk of nerve damage if they consistently have high blood sugar. This leaves the affected area at risk for infection, and if severe infection occurs and the infected limb is not removed, it can infect the rest of the body, which will most often lead to death. This is also the case with people who leave dangerous infections untreated: the tissue of that limb will begin to die, leaving amputation as the only way to save the person from sepsis as the infection spreads to the rest of the body. However, one can argue the use of a prosthesis after amputation would disqualify this method as an heroic measure, but there are also limitations and negative consequences to prosthesis use. This is more prevalent in isolated areas, where medical attention is very far away.

=== Cancer and end-of-life planning ===
Oftentimes, treatments like chemotherapy and Radiation therapy are also considered examples of heroic measures. Chemotherapy is a treatment that uses drugs to target and destroy rapidly-growing cells, like cancer cells. Radiation therapy uses high-energy x-rays to kill cancer cells. In medicine, chemotherapy and radiation are commonly used to treat cancer. Though it can be a very effective treatment for cancer, it does not come without its side effects—some of which are more serious than others. For example, some common side effects of chemotherapy and radiation include: fatigue, hair loss, nausea and vomiting, diarrhea, skin changes, and more. These side effects occur because chemotherapy and radiation kill not only cancer cells, but also normal, healthy cells in the body. Some more serious side effects that can also occur as a result of these treatments is damage to other organs in the body like the lungs, kidneys, nerves, heart, or reproductive organs. It is even possible for a second cancer to develop many years after chemotherapy. Although chemotherapy and radiation are commonly used as cancer treatments, there is potential harm to the body that can occur as a result of these treatments. However, sometimes there are no other treatment options available to treat the cancer and it is necessary to use chemotherapy or radiation in attempts to treat a person with cancer and save their life despite the side effects that can occur.

Often when people with cancer find that experimental chemotherapies are unsuccessful, end-of-life planning begins to start since that is usually the last line of resort for the person. Although there are arguments on whether end of life planning should be considered heroic since it does not prolong or save a person's life, similar to throwing the surrender flag up in the air. However, the topic is still relevant as unsuccessful heroic measures will usually lead to certain death as they are last resort. There has been concern for Oncology providers preferring to introduce end-of-life planning later after attempting all heroic measures when others argue that it should be emphasized before experimental chemotherapy starts. Many palliative care advocates argue that more emphasis should be placed offering this care as a viable option for people when deciding whether to try riskier experimental treatments or opt for a safer route of care.

== Ethical considerations ==
Often, the use of heroic measures is considered when a person is nearing the end of their life. Many healthcare providers try to work with individuals nearing the end of life to discuss 'end of life planning", also known as advanced care planning, to get a better understanding of the treatment that person would like to receive. There are many factors that individuals, families, and healthcare teams must consider when choosing a treatment plan for end-of-life care. The topic of a person's end of life can be a very difficult subject for these individuals, family members, and healthcare providers to discuss, so there can often be misunderstanding between these parties on what type of treatment is best for the person nearing end-of-life. Advanced care planning may be difficult for individuals to consider, but it can be a useful tool for families and healthcare providers when determining treatment and the use of heroic measures in the case when the individual is no longer able to make a decision themselves. Generally, taking a heroic measure in attempts to save someone's life towards the end is more costly than pursuing non-heroic measures for treatment. Overall, this raises questions and concerns regarding the cost of a person's life and if this is a factor that should be taken into consideration during end-of-life planning. Additionally, heroic measures taken during end-of-life tend to be more aggressive and raises concerns about quality of life after and if that is worth being compromised to save a life. Given that the use of heroic measures can also be challenging for healthcare providers to discuss, many institutions now have training and certificate programs specially designed to help healthcare providers overcome barriers associated with end-of-life decision-making.

The considerations regarding the use of heroic measures can be even more difficult to decide on when the individual receiving care is a child. Since this can be a very challenging time for all parties involved, healthcare providers and parents need to have a mutual understanding of what care will be provided for the child. In cases where a minor is old enough and competent, they should be involved in the decision-making process to the best of their ability with parents and healthcare providers respecting the decisions of the child. When making the decision over the use of heroic measures, caregivers and providers should consider treatments in which the benefits to the child outweigh the potential burdens treatment will cause. If there is discourse on whether a potential treatment may be the best choice for the child, providers, and caregivers should consider whether the treatment they will be performing is being done "for the child" or "to the child". Nevertheless, when facing the potential end-of-life of a child, it is important for healthcare teams to still leave room for hope for recovery as this can improve quality-of-life for children and their families at end-of-life.

== See also ==
- "Daughter from California syndrome"
- Drug of last resort
- Heroic medicine
- Salvage therapy
- Advanced Care Planning
