= New Delhi metallo-beta-lactamase 1 =

Antibiotic resistance enzyme in bacteria

Metallo-beta-lactamase type 1

Identifiers
- Organism: Klebsiella pneumoniae
- Symbol: blaNDM-1
- Orthologs: OMA: entry
- UniProt: C7C422
Search for
- Structures: Swiss-model
- Domains: InterPro

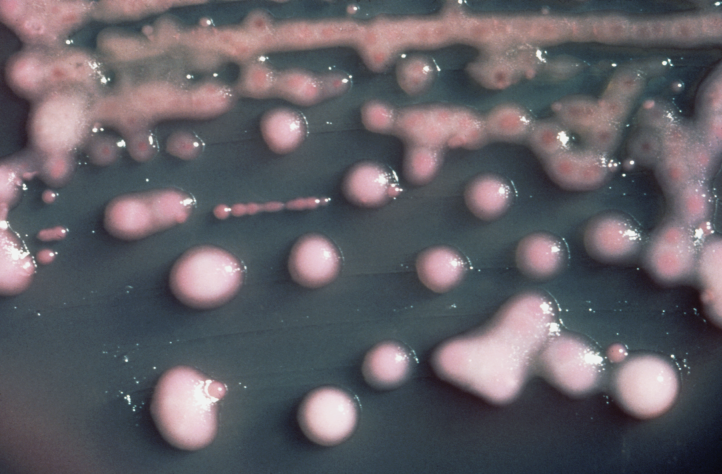
Klebsiella pneumoniae, the bacterium in which NDM-1 was first identified

NDM-1 is an enzyme in some strains of bacteria that confers resistance to a broad range of beta-lactam antibiotics. These include the antibiotics of the carbapenem family, which are a mainstay for the treatment of antibiotic-resistant bacterial infections. The gene for NDM-1 is one member of a large gene family that encodes beta-lactamase enzymes called carbapenemases. Bacteria that produce carbapenemases are often referred to in the news media as "superbugs" because infections caused by them are difficult to treat. Such bacteria are usually sensitive only to polymyxins and tigecycline.

NDM-1 was first detected in 2008 in a culture plate of Klebsiella pneumoniae isolated from a Swedish patient of Indian origin. It was later detected in bacteria in India, Pakistan, the United Kingdom, the United States, Canada, Japan, Egypt, and Iraq.

The most common bacteria that make this enzyme are gram-negative such as Escherichia coli and Klebsiella pneumoniae, but the gene for NDM-1 can spread from one strain of bacteria to another by horizontal gene transfer.

== Enzyme function ==
Structure of the carbapenem backbone

Carbapenems are a class of beta-lactam antibiotics that are capable of killing most bacteria by inhibiting the synthesis of one of their cell wall layers. The carbapenems were developed to overcome antibiotic resistance mediated by bacterial beta-lactamase enzymes. However, the bla_{NDM-1} gene produces NDM-1, which is a carbapenemase beta-lactamase—an enzyme that hydrolyzes and inactivates these carbapenem antibiotics.

Carbapenemases are particularly dangerous resistance mechanisms, since they can inactivate a wide range of different antibiotics. The NDM-1 enzyme is one of the class B metallo-beta-lactamase; other types of carbapenemase are class A or class D beta-lactamases. (The class A Klebsiella pneumoniae carbapenemase (KPC) is currently the most common carbapenemase, which was first detected in North Carolina, United States, in 1996 and has since spread worldwide. A later publication indicated that Enterobacteriaceae that produce KPC were becoming common in the United States.)

The resistance conferred by this gene (bla_{NDM-1}), therefore, aids the expansion of bacteria that carry it throughout a human host, since they will face less opposition/competition from populations of antibiotic-sensitive bacteria, which will be diminished by the original antibacterial treatment.

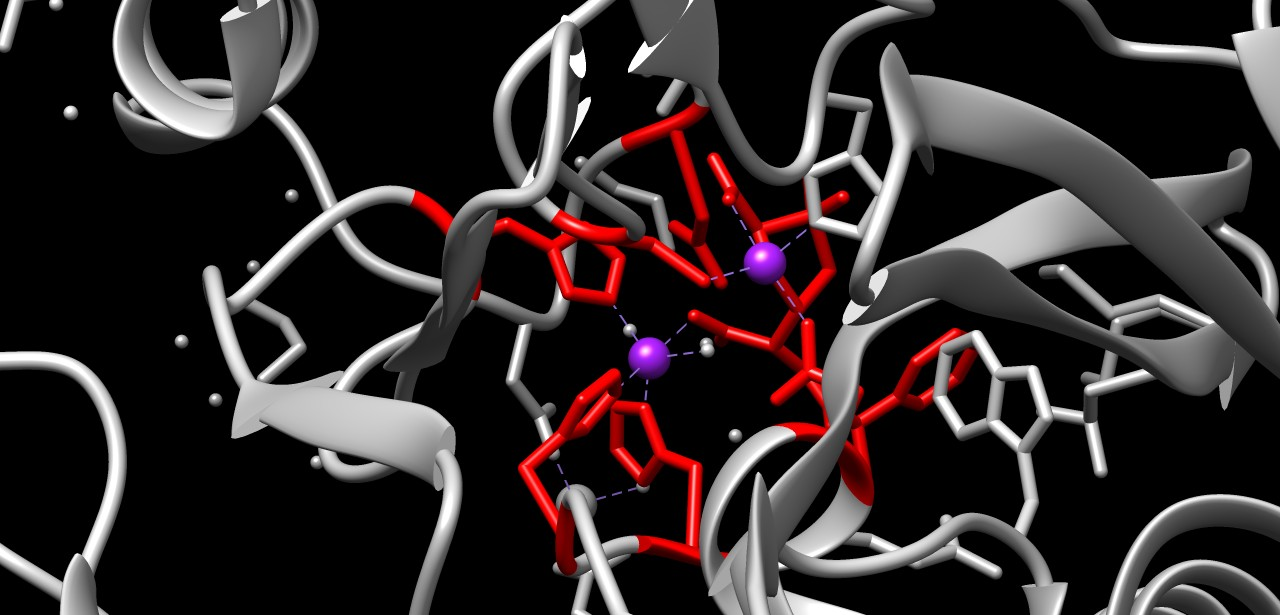
Two zinc ions present in the active binding site

NDM-1 functions through two zinc ions present in the active site that cause hydrolysis of the beta-lactams, rendering them ineffective. Experimental data has shown that zinc chelators can prevent the hydrolysis of beta-lactams mediated by metallo-beta-lactamases.

== Origin and spread ==
The NDM-1 enzyme was named after New Delhi, the capital city of India, as it was first described by Yong et al. in December 2009 in a Swedish national who fell ill with an antibiotic-resistant bacterial infection that he acquired in India. The infection was identified as a carbapenem-resistant Klebsiella pneumoniae strain bearing the novel gene bla_{NDM-1}. The authors concluded that the new resistance mechanism "clearly arose in India, but there are few data arising from India to suggest how widespread it is". Its exact geographical origin, however, has not been conclusively verified. In March 2010, a study in a hospital in Mumbai found that most carbapenem-resistant bacteria isolated from patients carried the bla_{NDM-1} gene. Later, the journal editor apologized for allowing the name.

NDM-1 β-lactamase was also found in a K. pneumoniae isolate from Croatia, and the patient arrived from Bosnia and Herzegovina. The second geographical origin is considered to be eastern Balkans.

In May 2010, a case of infection with E. coli expressing NDM-1 was reported in Coventry in the United Kingdom. The patient was a man of Indian origin who had visited India 18 months previously, where he had undergone dialysis. In initial assays the bacterium was fully resistant to all antibiotics tested, while later tests found that it was susceptible to tigecycline and colistin. The authors warned that international travel and patients' use of multiple countries' healthcare systems could lead to the "rapid spread of NDM-1 with potentially serious consequences".

As of June 2010, there were three reported cases of Enterobacteriaceae isolates bearing this newly described resistance mechanism in the US, the Centers for Disease Control and Prevention (CDC) stated that "All three U.S. isolates were from patients having received recent medical care in India." However, US experts stated that it is unclear as to whether this strain is any more dangerous than existing antibiotic-resistant bacteria such as methicillin-resistant Staphylococcus aureus, which are already common in the USA.

Structure of colistin, one of the few antibiotics able to kill NDM-1 producing bacteria

In July 2010, a team in New Delhi reported a cluster of three cases of Acinetobacter baumannii bearing bla_{NDM-1} that were found in the intensive care unit of a hospital in Chennai, India, in April 2010. As previously, the bacteria were fully resistant to all the aminoglycoside, β-lactam, and quinolone antibiotics, but were susceptible to tigecycline and colistin. This particularly broad spectrum of antibiotic resistance was heightened by the strain's expressing several different resistance genes in addition to bla_{NDM-1}.

A study by a multi-national team was published in the August 2010 issue of the journal The Lancet Infectious Diseases. This examined the emergence and spread of bacteria carrying the bla_{NDM-1} gene. This reported on 37 cases in the United Kingdom, 44 isolates with NDM-1in Chennai, 26 in Haryana, and 73 in various other sites in Pakistan and India. The authors' analysis of the strains showed that many carried bla_{NDM-1} on plasmids, which will allow the gene to be readily transferred between different strains of bacteria by horizontal gene transfer. All the isolates were resistant to multiple different classes of antibiotics, including beta-lactam antibiotics, fluoroquinolones, and aminoglycosides, but most were still susceptible to the polymyxin antibiotic colistin.

On 21 August 2010, Ontario, Canada, had its first confirmed case of the "superbug" in Brampton. There were other confirmed cases in British Columbia and Alberta. These confirmed NDM-1 infected cases have no relationship with New Delhi, India. The patients or their relatives never travelled to India in the last decade.

On 6 September 2010, Japan detected its first ever case of the NDM-1 enzyme. In May 2009, a Japanese man in his 50s who had recently returned from vacation in India was struck with a fever and hospitalized, later making a full recovery. Hospital officials confirmed that tests carried out after the patient's recovery were positive for the NDM-1 enzyme.

An environmental point prevalence study conducted between 26 September and 10 October 2010 found bacteria with the NDM-1 gene in drinking water and seepage samples in New Delhi. 50 tap water samples and 171 seepage samples were collected from sites within 12 km of central New Delhi. Of these samples, 20 strains of bacteria were found to contain NDM-1 gene in 51 out of 171 seepage samples and 2 out of 50 tap water samples.

On 8 May 2012, the presence of NDM was found in a patient who died at Royal Alexandra Hospital in Edmonton, Alberta. The patient was also found to be carrying an Acinetobacter strain. The patient contracted the bacteria after another patient, who had surgery on the Indian subcontinent, traveled to Canada and was admitted to hospital with an infection.

Science Daily reported on the 16 December 2013 that a team of scientists from Rice, Nankai and Tianjin universities found NDM-1 in two wastewater treatment plants in northern China. In fact, the NDM-1 was unable to be removed after several treatments and attempts to disinfect the plants. Disinfection by chlorine, one of the most effective methods currently, also failed to eradicate the beta-lactamase.

In June 2014 it was reported that the molecule aspergillomarasmine A from the Aspergillus fungus turns off the resistance mechanism of NDM-1 and thus makes bacteria once again sensitive to traditional antibiotics. It has been shown to be effective in mice and rats but has not yet been tested in humans for safety or effectiveness.

In September 2016, a 70-year-old woman in Reno, Nevada, died of septic shock following infection with NDM-producing Klebsiella pneumoniae. She had been on an extended trip to India and was admitted to a hospital there for an infected right hip.

== Phenotypic detection of NDM-1 ==
Detection of NDM-1 gene depends upon the phenotypic determination of the enzyme activity. These enzymes are zinc dependent and therefore termed as metallo-beta-lactamase. Indian studies have been done which demonstrate their dependency on zinc and the ability of zinc chelating agents like EDTA to decrease their activity. The Modified Hodge Test and the Re-Modified Hodge Test were developed for phenotypical detection on a routine basis in resource limited laboratories. Other tests for phenotypic detection are:

- Double disk synergy testing (DDST)
- Vitek detection (Automated system)
- E-test (E-Strip)

== Criticism of enzyme name ==
The Indian health ministry has disputed the conclusion of the August 2010 Lancet study that the gene originated in India, describing this conclusion as "unfair" and stating that Indian hospitals are perfectly safe for treatment. Indian politicians have described linking this new drug resistance gene to India as "malicious propaganda" and blamed multinational corporations for what they describe as selective malignancy. A Bharatiya Janata Party politician has instead argued that the journal article is bogus and represented an attempt to scare medical tourists away from India. The Indian Ministry of Health released a statement "strongly refut[ing]" naming the enzyme "New Delhi". A co-author of the 2010 Lancet study, who is based in the University of Madras, has stated that he does not agree with the part of the article that advises people to avoid elective surgeries in India.

In contrast, an editorial in the March 2010 issue of the Journal of Association of Physicians of India blamed the emergence of this gene on the widespread misuse of antibiotics in the Indian healthcare system, stating that Indian doctors have "not yet taken the issue of antibiotic resistance seriously" and noting little control over the prescription of antibiotics by doctors and even pharmacists. The Times of India states that there is general agreement among experts that India needs both an improved policy to control the use of antibiotics and a central registry of antibiotic-resistant infections.

=== Response to criticism ===
The British journal The Lancet refused to publish a rebuttal from the Indian National Centre for Disease Control, claiming lack of space and that the journal's editors felt it would be better placed elsewhere. However, on 12 January 2011, the editor of The Lancet, Richard Horton, apologized and acknowledged that naming the resistance enzyme after New Delhi was an "error". Following this, Ajai R. Singh, editor of Mens Sana Monographs, demanded that such 'geographic names giving' be abandoned and replaced by 'scientific name giving'. He proposed changing NDM-1 to PCM (plasmid-encoding carbapenem-resistant metallo-beta-lactamase).

== Deaths ==
The first reported death due to bacteria expressing the NDM-1 enzyme was recorded in August 2010, when a Belgian man infected while undergoing treatment in a hospital in Pakistan died despite being administered colistin. A doctor involved in his treatment said: "He was involved in a car accident during a trip to Pakistan. He was hospitalised with a major leg injury and then repatriated to Belgium, but he was already infected". In another case, an Indian citizen, died in a hospital because of similar infection.

== See also ==
- Antibiotic resistance
- GSK 299423, antibiotic chemical compound
- List of antibiotic resistant bacteria
- Medical tourism
- Methicillin-resistant Staphylococcus aureus
- MCR-1
- Nosocomial infection
- Transduction (genetics)
