= GSK 299423 =

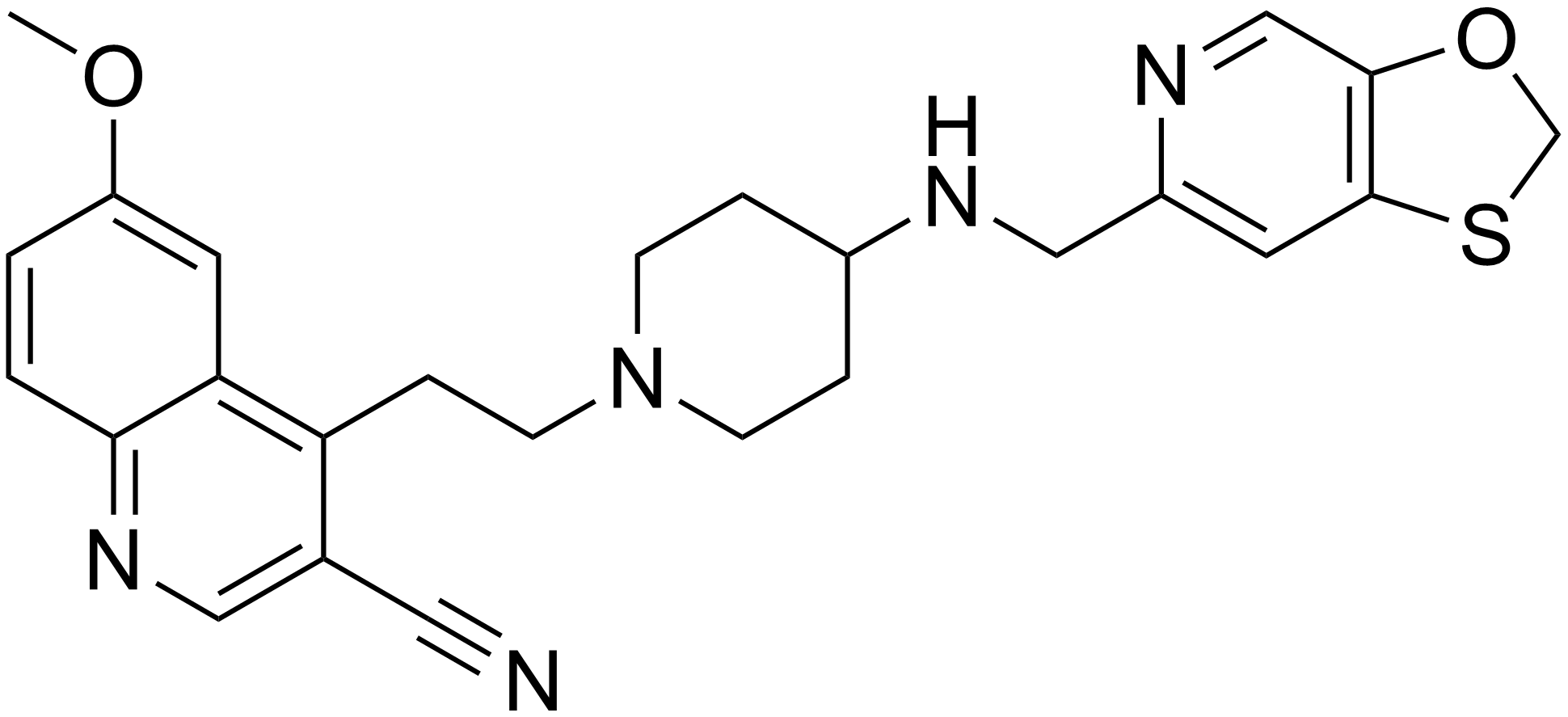

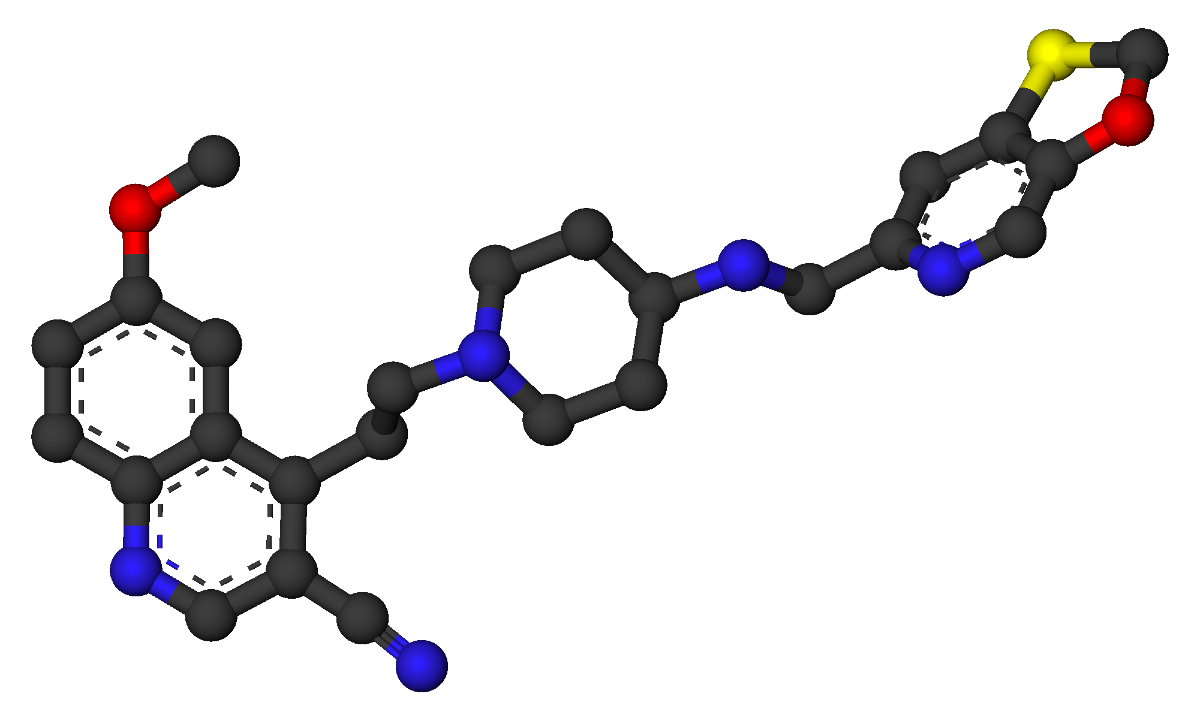

Names
- Preferred IUPAC name 6-Methoxy-4-[2-(4-{[(2H-[1,3]oxathiolo[5,4-c]pyridin-6-yl)methyl]amino}piperidin-1-yl)ethyl]quinoline-3-carbonitrile

Identifiers
CAS Number	1352149-24-6
3D model (JSmol)	Interactive image
ChemSpider	24751852
PubChem CID	46835136
UNII	2Q0G81H7FK
CompTox Dashboard (EPA)	DTXSID50159279
- InChI: InChI=1S/C25H27N5O2S/c1-31-20-2-3-23-22(11-20)21(17(12-26)13-29-23)6-9-30-7-4-18(5-8-30)27-14-19-10-25-24(15-28-19)32-16-33-25/h2-3,10-11,13,15,18,27H,4-9,14,16H2,1H3 Key: NKXJSCXEAVZSMF-UHFFFAOYSA-N
- SMILES: COc1ccc2c(c1)c(c(cn2)C#N)CCN3CCC(CC3)NCc4cc5c(cn4)OCS5

Properties
Chemical formula	C_{25}H_{27}N_{5}O_{2}S
Molar mass	461.58 g·mol^{−1}
- Except where otherwise noted, data are given for materials in their standard state (at 25 °C [77 °F], 100 kPa). verify (what is ?) Infobox references

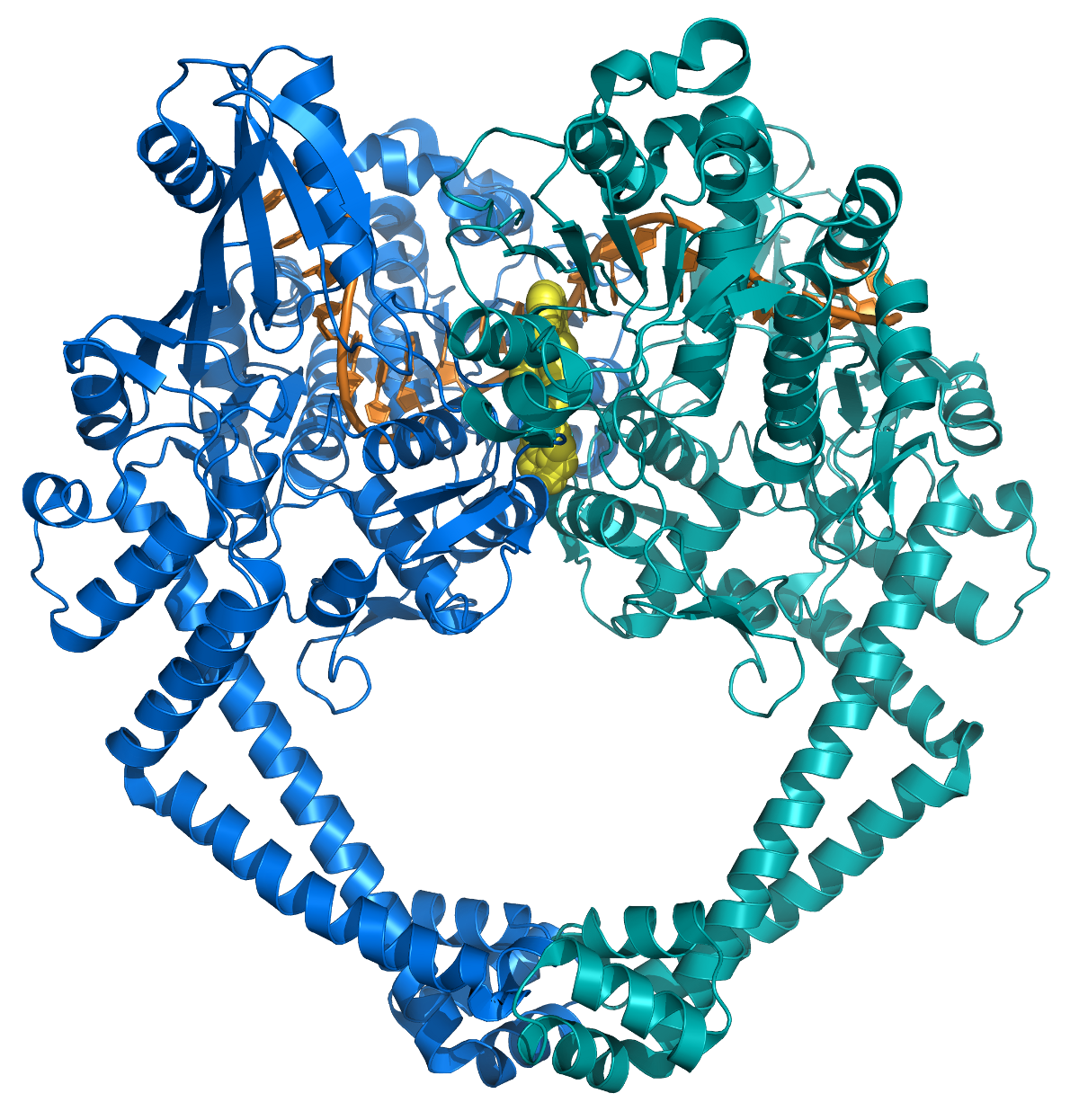
3D protein map of GSK 299423 (yellow) in complex with Staphylococcus aureus DNA gyrase (teal) and a DNA fragment (orange). From PDB: 2xcs.

GSK 299423 or GlaxoSmithKline 299423 is an antibiotic chemical compound that has been identified as potentially effective in treating patients infected with bacteria expressing the New Delhi metallo-beta-lactamase. The antibiotic inhibits the enzyme topoisomerase, which bacteria need to replicate.

No animal studies have been reported. No application has been made for human clinical trials.
