= Sir Syed Global Scholar Award =

Academic support initiative

SSGSA Award
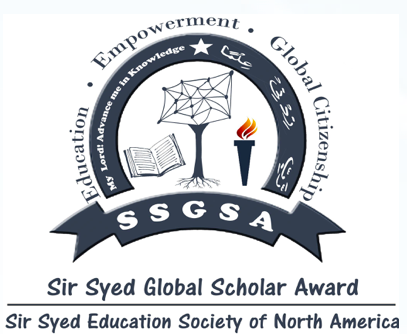
- Awarded for: Emerging Indian scholars pursuing global higher education
- Presented by: Sir Syed Education Society of North America
- First award: 2006; 20 years ago
- Website: ssgsa.us

The Sir Syed Global Scholar Award (SSGSA) is an academic support initiative founded in 2006 to assist students and alumni of Aligarh Muslim University (AMU), India, in pursuing higher education abroad. Administered by the Sir Syed Education Society of North America, a U.S.-based nonprofit organization, the program provides mentorship and financial assistance.

== History and development ==
The program was originally launched as the "Sir Syed Excellence in Science Award" in 2006 with the aim of facilitating access to graduate programs in the United States for AMU students. It was later renamed to reflect an expanded international scope.

Awardees receive support for graduate school applications, including funding for standardized test registration and application fees. They are also matched with volunteer mentors—often AMU alumni working in academia or industry—who guide them through the university application process. The scope of the program later expanded to cover additional disciplines and destinations, including universities in Europe, Canada, and Asia.

== Impact ==
As of 2025, the program has supported over 200 awardees in securing admission to universities in more than 20 countries. In 2020, during SSGSA's annual convention, Nobel Laureate in Economics Abhijit Banerjee commended the organization as “a very noble enterprise and one that has great potential for transforming the lives of many people.”

Several alumni have later earned research fellowships and academic recognitions in institutions across the United States and Europe, including Humboldt Fellowships, Commonwealth Scholarships, Chevening Scholarships, etc. Alumni have contributed to international scientific collaborations, including teams at CERN that were recognized with the 2025 Breakthrough Prize in Fundamental Physics, as well as collaborations with LIGO, the IceCube Neutrino Observatory, and NASA’s Interstellar Mapping and Acceleration Probe. One alumnus co-authored a 2025 study from the University of Texas at Austin examining the movement of early Martian surface water into deep aquifers. Another alumnus worked with researchers at the University of California, Davis and Berkeley Lab on laser-based purification methods for producing ultra-pure silica. Several alumni are involved in research projects at U.S. national laboratories, including the National High Magnetic Field Laboratory, Argonne National Laboratory, Fermilab, and SLAC National Accelerator Laboratory. Another alumnus contributed to research at Clemson University that developed novel dual-conductive materials for next-generation lithium-ion batteries. In 2026, one alumnus was selected as a graduate commencement speaker at the University of Massachusetts Boston.

One alumnus was recognized in Forbes Middle East as a “Next Generation Business Leader, Arab World” during 2017–2019, and was later included in the Forbes magazine's “Top 100 Healthcare Leaders” lists for 2024 and 2025.

The organization has also collaborated with several U.S. universities to host Indian students for short-term summer research internships. These internships provide participants with short-term exposure to research environments outside India.

== Community engagement ==
Many award recipients stay involved with the program after completing their studies. Many participate in peer mentoring, educational outreach, and nonprofit efforts to expand access to international education opportunities for underrepresented groups. This structure has contributed to the development of a continuing peer and alumni network.

== Media coverage ==
The initiative has been covered in Indian and international media, particularly for its role in supporting students from underrepresented backgrounds pursuing education abroad. A 2013 article in Business Standard highlighted its early collaborations with U.S. institutions that hosted AMU students for summer research internships. The Higher Education Review also reported on these partnerships. Each year, announcements of the SSGSA awards are covered by Indian media outlets including the Hindustan Times, Ummid News, and Salam-e-Vatan.
