= Heteroresistance =

Bacterial phenotype

Heteroresistance is a phenotype in which a bacterial isolate forms a subpopulation of cells with increased antibiotic resistance compared to the susceptible main population. While the definition differs across studies, most commonly accepted thresholds are for the subpopulation to have the MIC value at least 8-fold higher than the main population and be present with frequency above 10^{-7}. This phenomenon is known to be highly prevalent among several antibiotic classes and bacterial isolates and associated with treatment failure through the enrichment of resistant subpopulations in the presence of antibiotics. Heteroresistance is highly unstable, meaning that the enriched resistant subpopulation can revert to low frequency within a limited number of generations of growth in the absence of antibiotic. Due to the instability and the transient character of heteroresistance, the detection using conventional methods, such as Etests and disk diffusion tests, is inefficient. The standard for detecting heteroresistance is population analysis profile test (PAP-test). It is however a labour-intensive and costly method making it difficult to implement in clinical microbiology laboratories. Hence, the prevalence of heteroresistance remains underreported and clinical relevance hard to assess.

== Mechanisms ==
The enrichment of resistance sub-populations can be due to the acquisition of resistance mutations that are genetically stable but have high fitness cost or due to the enrichment of sub-population with increased copy number of resistance-conferring genes. Tandem gene amplification of antibiotic resistance genes, which results in an increased gene dosage of the resistance genes, is the most common mechanism for heteroresistance in Gram-negative bacteria.

Two other mechanisms conferring heteroresistance, resulting in an increased gene dosage of the resistance genes, are plasmid copy number increase and transposition of the resistance genes onto cryptic plasmids which increases in copy number. However, this mechanism is considered unstable, leading to a rapid return to susceptibility when antibiotics are not present.

== Clinical relevance ==
Heteroresistance is thought to be one of the explanations behind treatment failure, when an isolate is determined susceptible to the given antibiotic. There is growing evidence showing that misdiagnosis of heteroresistance is frequent at clinical microbiology laboratories and can be associated with treatment complications as well as increased mortality. Studies have shown that machine learning based detection of heteroresistance might be possible, a fact that would significantly improve the misdiagnosis outcomes in the clinics.
