= Paenibacillus polymyxa =

Scientific classification
- Domain: Bacteria
- Kingdom: Bacillati
- Phylum: Bacillota
- Class: Bacilli
- Order: Paenibacillales
- Family: Paenibacillaceae
- Genus: Paenibacillus
- Species: P. polymyxa

Binomial name
- Paenibacillus polymyxa (Prazmowski 1880); Ash et al. 1994

Type strain
- ATCC 842; CCUG 1086; CFBP 4258; CIP 66.22; DSM 36; HAMBI 635 and 1897; JCM 2507; LMG 13294; NBRC 15309; NCCB 24016; NCTC 10343; NRRL B-4317; VKM B-514

Synonyms
- Bacillus polymyxa (Prazmowski 1880) Macé 1889; Clostridium polymyxa Prazmowski 1880; Granulobacter polymyxa (Prazmowski 1880) Beijerinck 1893; Aerobacillus polymyxa (Prazmowski 1880) Donker 1926; Pseudomonas azotogensis Voets and Debacker

Species of bacterium

Paenibacillus polymyxa, also known as Bacillus polymyxa, is a Gram-positive bacterium capable of fixing nitrogen. It is found in soil, plant tissues, marine sediments and hot springs. It may have a role in forest ecosystems and potential future applications as a biofertilizer and biocontrol agent in agriculture.

== Growth conditions ==
P. polymyxa can be grown in the laboratory on trypticase soy agar medium. It can also be grown on brain heart infusion agar medium.

== Applications ==
=== Agricultural use ===
P. polymyxa might have possible future applications as a soil inoculant in agriculture and horticulture. Biofilms of P. polymyxa growing on plant roots have been shown to produce exopolysaccharides which protect the plants from pathogens. The interactions between this bacterial species and plant roots also cause the root hairs to undergo physical changes.

=== Antibiotics ===
Some strains of P. polymyxa produce antibiotics including fusaricidin and polymyxins. P. polymyxa var. colistinus produces the antibiotic colistin.

Surfactant complexes isolated from P. polymyxa have been shown to be effective in disrupting biofilms of Bacillus subtilis, Micrococcus luteus, Pseudomonas aeruginosa, Staphylococcus aureus and Streptococcus bovis.

=== Cell extraction ===
P. polymyxa is a source of dispase, an enzyme used to isolate cells from animal tissues.
