= Neomycin/polymyxin B/bacitracin =

Antibiotic medication

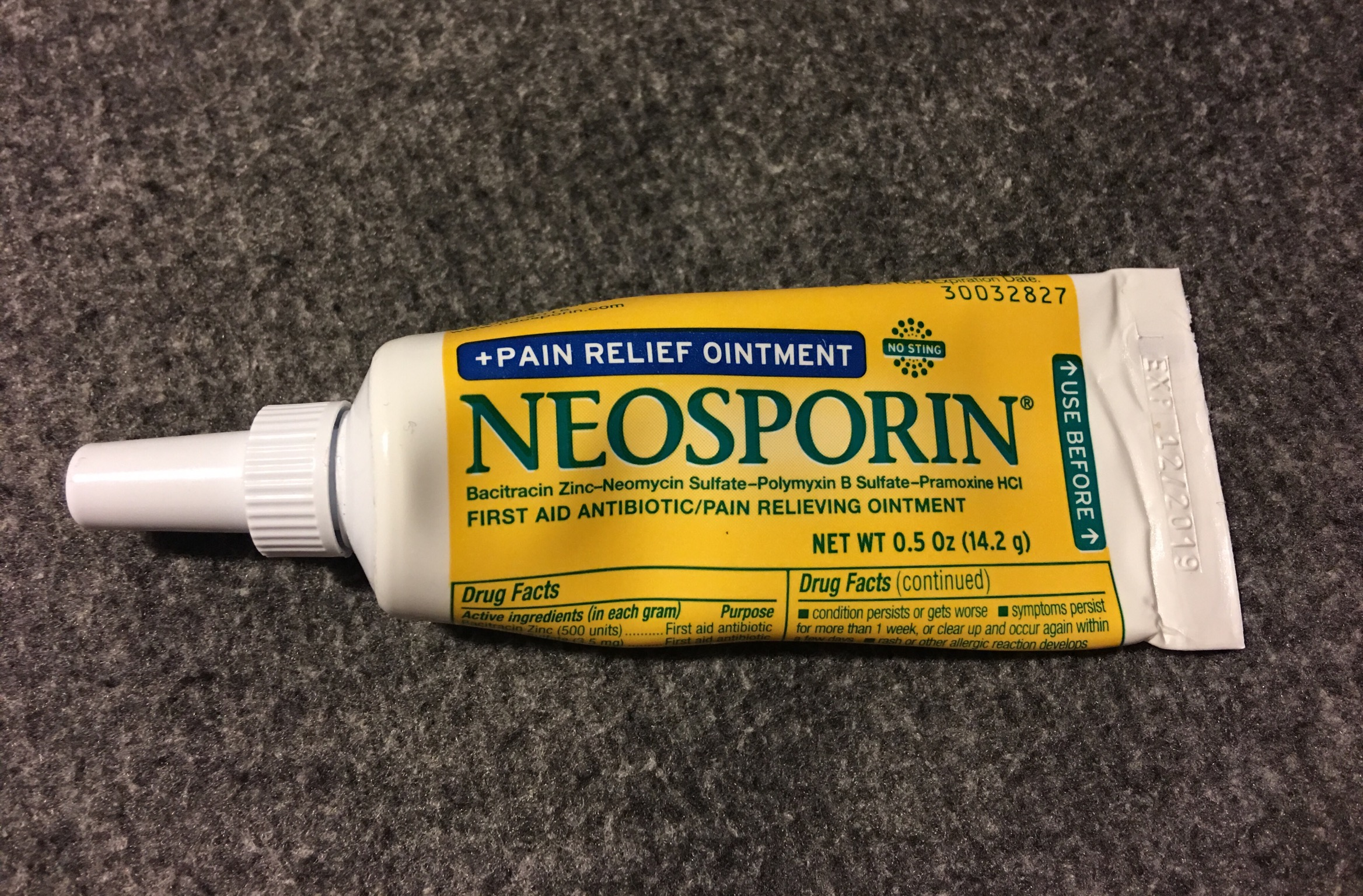
- Squeeze tube of triple antibiotic ointment (marketed since 1952)

Combination of
- Polymyxin B sulfate: Antibiotic
- Neomycin sulfate: Antibiotic
- Bacitracin zinc: Antibiotic

Clinical data
- Trade names: Neosporin, others
- AHFS/Drugs.com: Multum Consumer Information
- MedlinePlus: a601098
- License data: US DailyMed: Neomycin and polymyxin b and bacitracin
- Routes of administration: Topical, Ophthalmic drug administration
- ATC code: A07AA51 (WHO)

Legal status
- Legal status: US: OTC / Rx-only

Identifiers
- CAS Number: 8057-37-2
- ChemSpider: 10481985
- KEGG: D02531

Neomycin/polymyxin B/bacitracin, also known as triple antibiotic ointment, and sold under the brand name Neosporin, among others, is an antibiotic medication used to reduce the risk of infections following minor skin injuries. It contains the antibiotics neomycin, polymyxin B, and bacitracin, and is for topical use.

Possible side effects include itchiness and skin rash, and in rare cases hearing loss. It is relatively broad spectrum, being effective against both Gram-negative and Gram-positive bacteria.

The combination is available over the counter in the US and Canada. In 2023, it was the 367th most commonly prescribed medication in the United States, with more than 15,000 prescriptions.

== Medical uses ==
Neomycin/polymyxin B/bacitracin ointment is reported to be a safe and effective topical agent for preventing infections in minor skin trauma.

It is used for burns, scratches, cuts, and minor skin infections. The use of neomycin/polymyxin B/bacitracin, decreases infection rates in minor-contaminated wounds (hence for external use only).

== Side effects ==
It has been shown to cause contact dermatitis in some cases.

== Antibiotic-resistant bacteria ==
Concern exists that its use contributes to the emergence of antibiotic-resistant bacteria (the US is the only large market for the ointment). For instance, it may increase the prevalence of methicillin-resistant Staphylococcus aureus (MRSA) bacteria, specifically the highly lethal ST8:USA300 strain.

A study of Staphylococcus aureus, coagulase-negative staphylococci, Pseudomonas aeruginosa, Escherichia coli and other Enterobacterales clinical isolates from the US in 1997-2002 showed that triple ointment resistance remained rare (5%) in Staphylococcus aureus and absent in other species, despite the triple antibiotic ointment having been available for use since 1952. The reason was either because neomycin did not select for resistance to other aminoglycosides or the combination of the three antibiotics minimized resistance selection. Clinical isolates from Australia, where the triple ointment had not been available showed comparable low or absence of resistance in the same species in 2002-2003.

== Components ==
The 2023 updated Johnson & Johnson Consumer Inc. label for their product discloses three different antibiotics: bacitracin zinc 400 units, neomycin sulfate 3.5 mg, and polymyxin B sulfate 5,000 units, in a relatively low-molecular-weight base of petroleum jelly, cottonseed oil, olive oil, and cocoa butter, and with sodium pyruvate and tocopheryl acetate.

The generic name for these products, regardless of the base, is "triple antibiotic ointment". In China, this product (with lidocaine HCl) is named "FONOW^{®} Ointment (孚诺^{®}软膏, Compound Polymyxin B Ointment)" and is exclusively manufactured and sold by Zhejiang Fonow Medicine Co. Ltd. The product was also marketed by the Upjohn Company under the name "Mycitracin", until 1997 when that name was acquired by Johnson & Johnson.

Some people have allergic reactions to neomycin, so a "double antibiotic ointment" is sold without it, containing only bacitracin and polymyxin B: one such example is Polysporin branded product.

A variant of Polysporin, called Polysporin Triple Ointment, replaces neomycin with gramicidin, providing an alternative for those allergic to neomycin while still offering broad-spectrum coverage against both Gram-negative and Gram-positive bacteria.

=== Active ingredients ===
The three main active ingredients in Neosporin are neomycin sulfate, polymyxin B sulfate, and bacitracin zinc.

One of the main components is neomycin sulfate, which is a type of antibiotic discovered in 1949 by microbiologist Selman Waksman at Rutgers University. Neomycin belongs to the aminoglycoside class of antibiotics and fights against Gram positive and gram negative bacteria. The antibiotic is often used to prevent risk of bacterial infections. Aminoglycosides work by binding to bacterial RNA and changing the ability to produce proteins while exerting little to no effect on DNA. Thus, neomycin kills bacteria as a result of irregular protein production in the bacterial cell. When the cell can no longer produce the correct proteins, its membrane becomes damaged. As a result of damaged membrane, the affected bacterial cells die, and the infection is prevented or limited.

Pramoxine is used to temporarily reduce pain from burns, insect bites, and minor cuts. It works like an anesthetic by decreasing the permeability of neuron membranes. As a result, pain neurons in the area have difficulty sending signals (or signals are blocked entirely), resulting in numbness.

In some countries bacitracin is replaced with gramicidin. The original Neosporin contained this combination.

== History ==
There is no exact date as to when the antibacterial ointment was invented, but it was used as early as the 1950s. This antibiotic ointment was patented in the United States in August 1952.

The brand Neosporin was first used in commerce in August 1952, and trademarked in October 1952.
