= Bacitracin/polymyxin B =

Combination drug

Combination of
- Bacitracin zinc: Antibacterial
- Polymyxin B sulfate: Antibacterial

Clinical data
- Trade names: Polysporin, others
- AHFS/Drugs.com: Multum Consumer Information
- License data: US DailyMed: Bacitracin and polymyxin b
- Routes of administration: Topical
- ATC code: D06AX05 (WHO)

Legal status
- Legal status: CA: OTC; US: OTC

Identifiers
- CAS Number: 118933-13-4

Bacitracin/polymyxin B, sold under the brand name Polysporin, among others, is a topical antibiotic cream or ointment. The active ingredients are polymyxin B, bacitracin and occasionally garamycin or gramicidin. Though Polysporin is marketed in the US, it holds a much smaller market share than in Canada and acts as a substitute to Johnson & Johnson's Neosporin for those allergic to the antibiotic neomycin. However, allergy to bacitracin/polymyxin B has also been reported. There is also an ophthalmological ointment, eye and ear drops.
