= Drug of last resort =

Type of drug

A drug of last resort (DoLR), also known as a heroic dose, is a pharmaceutical drug which is tried after all other drug options have failed to produce an adequate response in the patient. Drug resistance, such as antimicrobial resistance or antineoplastic resistance, may make the first-line drug ineffective, especially in case of multidrug-resistant pathogens and tumors. Such an alternative may be outside of extant regulatory requirements or medical best practices, in which case it may be viewed as salvage therapy.

== Purposes ==
The use of a drug of last resort may be based on agreement among members of a patient's care network, including physicians and healthcare professionals across multiple specialties, or on a patient's desire to pursue a particular course of treatment and a practitioner's willingness to administer that course. Certain situations such as severe bacterial related sepsis or septic shock can more commonly lead to last resorts.

Therapies considered to be drugs of last resort may at times be used earlier, in the event that an agent would likely show the most immediate dose-response related efficacy in time-critical situations, such as high mortality circumstances. Many of the drugs considered last resorts fall into the categories of antibiotics, antivirals, and chemotherapy agents. These agents often exhibit what are considered to be among the most efficient dose-response related effects, or are drugs for which few or no resistant strains are known.

When used for the teatment of infectious pathological disease, drugs of last resort are commonly withheld from administration until after the trial and failure of more commonly used treatment options, to prevent the development of drug resistance. One of the most commonly known examples of both antimicrobial resistance and the relationship to the classification of a drug of last resort is the emergence of Staphylococcus aureus (MRSA), sometimes also referred to as multiple-drug resistant S. aureus, due to resistance to non-penicillin antibiotics that some strains of S. aureus have shown to exhibit. In cases presenting with suspected S. aureus, it is suggested by many public health institutions, including the World Health Organization (WHO) and the Centers for Disease Control and Prevention (CDC), to treat first with empirical therapies for S. aureus, with an emphasis on evaluating the response to initial treatment and laboratory diagnostic techniques to isolate cases of drug resistance.

Due to the possibility of potential severe or fatal consequences of resistant strains, initial treatment often includes concomitant administration of multiple antimicrobial agents that are not known to show cross-resistance, so as to reduce the possibility of a resistant strain remaining inadequately treated by a single agent during the evaluation of drug response. Once a specific resistance profile has been isolated via clinical laboratory findings, treatment is often modified as indicated.

Vancomycin has long been considered a drug of last resort, due to its efficiency in treating multiple drug-resistant infectious agents and the requirement for intravenous administration. Recently, resistance to even vancomycin has been shown in some strains of S. aureus (sometimes referred to as vancomycin resistant S. aureus (VRSA) or vancomycin intermediate-resistance S. aureus (VISA)), often coinciding with methicillin/penicillin resistance, prompting the inclusion of newer antibiotics, such as linezolid, that have shown efficacy in highly drug-resistant strains. There are also strains of enterococci that have developed resistance to vancomycin, referred to as vancomycin resistant enterococcus (VRE).

Agents classified as fourth-line (or greater) treatments or experimental therapies could be considered by default to be drugs of last resort due to their low placement in the treatment hierarchy. Such placement may be due to greater efficacy of other agents, socioeconomic considerations, availability issues, unpleasant side effects or similar issues relating to patient tolerance. Some experimental therapies might also be called drugs of last resort when administered following the failure of all other currently accepted treatments.

Although most of the notable drugs of last resort are antibiotics or antivirals, other drugs are sometimes considered drugs of last resort, such as cisapride.

== Examples ==
=== Antimicrobials ===
- Aminoglycosides — an antibacterial; its use is extremely restricted due to risk of hearing loss and kidney damage.
- Amphotericin B — used for life-threatening fungal infections and primary amoebic meningoencephalitis; its side effects are often severe or potentially fatal.
- Carbapenems (such as imipenem/cilastatin) — used as a drug of last resort for a variety of different bacterial infections; use is limited to prevent development of drug resistance.
- Ceftobiprole and ceftaroline — fifth-generation cephalosporins active against methicillin-resistant Staphylococcus aureus (MRSA); use is limited to prevent development of drug resistance.
- Cefiderocol — a cephalosporin used to treat complicated urinary tract infections (cUTI) caused by multi-drug resistant Gram-negative bacteria in patients with limited or no alternative options; use is limited for other MDRGN bacteria since its safety and efficacy have not been established.
- Chloramphenicol — formerly first-line therapy for Rocky Mountain spotted fever (until doxycycline became available), current first-line therapy (topically) for bacterial conjunctivitis, and (systemically) for meningitis when allergies to penicillin or cephalosporin exist; use of intravenous chloramphenicol carries unacceptably high risk of irreversible, fatal aplastic anemia and gray baby syndrome.
- Colistin — used against certain life-threatening infections, such as those caused by Pseudomonas; carries risk of kidney and nerve damage.
- Fostemsavir (an HIV attachment inhibitor) and lenacapavir (an HIV capsid inhibitor) are indicated in heavily treatment-experienced adults with multidrug-resistant HIV-1 infection failing their current antiretroviral regimen due to resistance, intolerance, or safety considerations.
- Melarsoprol — a highly toxic antiprotozoal typically reserved for use only in late stages of the T. b. rhodesiense type of African trypanosomiasis, wherein it remains the only treatment; often results in polyneuropathy and reactive encephalopathy, resulting in death in around 5% of patients.
- Linezolid — used to treat drug-resistant infections of the skin and pneumonia; use is limited due to high cost and risk of vision loss or myopathy.
- Tigecycline — used to kill Acinetobacter and Legionella species; limited by high cost, risk of liver injury and an apparent increase in mortality.

=== Other drugs ===
- Alosetron — used in the management of severe chronic diarrhea-predominant irritable bowel syndrome (IBS-D) in females not responsive to conventional therapy; its use is restricted due to serious gastrointestinal adverse reactions, such ischemic colitis and complications of constipation.
- Cisapride — used for severe gastroesophageal reflux disease (GERD); carries risk of heart arrhythmias.
- Clomethiazole — a sedative/hypnotic agent used in the treatment of alcohol withdrawal when benzodiazepines are not effective; its use is limited due to its high toxicity and potential for addiction.
- Clozapine — used in treatment-resistant schizophrenia not responsive to at least two different antipsychotics; its use is limited due to the risk of severe side effects including agranulocytosis, seizures and myocarditis.
- Felbamate — an anticonvulsant used in refractory epilepsy; associated with an increased risk of aplastic anemia and liver failure.
- Isotretinoin — used when all topical treatments or antibiotics against acne have failed, it permanently dries out the sebum production of the skin and is often a permanent solution against acne; can cause severe side effects including severe nosebleeds, birth defects when taken while pregnant, depression, hair loss and can permanently dry out the skin all over the body.
- Levosimendan — used in acutely decompensated severe chronic heart failure in situations where conventional therapy is not sufficient; not yet approved in the US.
- Minoxidil — first-line, low dose topical drug for hair loss, can also be used orally at a high dose for hypertension; oral minoxidil has been implicated in heart problems including pericardial effusion.
- Monoamine oxidase inhibitors — used for treatment-resistant depression; may have potentially lethal dietary and drug interactions which may trigger hypertensive crisis and/or serotonin syndrome.
- Thalidomide — originally prescribed for morning sickness, withdrawn in 1961 owing to widespread incidence of severe birth defects (phocomelia or tetraamelia) after prenatal use by pregnant women; approved by the US Food and Drug Administration for erythema nodosum leprosum (ENL) in 1998, and new cases of multiple myeloma (administered with dexamethasone) in 2008; also used "off-label" for rare cancers; can cause multiple severe side effects and cannot be prescribed to pregnant women.
- Tolcapone — used in patients with Parkinson's disease who are not appropriate candidates for other adjunctive therapies; use is restricted due to hepatotoxicity.
- Vigabatrin — used for extreme treatment-resistant epilepsy; carries risk of permanent vision loss.

== See also ==
- Heroic measure
