= Polymyxin B =

Antibiotic medication

Clinical data
- Trade names: Poly-Rx, others
- AHFS/Drugs.com: Monograph
- Pregnancy category: B
- Routes of administration: Topical, intramuscular, intravenous, intrathecal, eye drops
- ATC code: A07AA05 (WHO) J01XB02 (WHO) S01AA18 (WHO) S02AA11 (WHO) S03AA03 (WHO) QJ51XB02 (WHO)

Legal status
- Legal status: In general: Over-the-counter (OTC)

Identifiers
- IUPAC name: N-[4-amino-1-[[1-[[4-amino-1-oxo-1-[[6,9,18-tris(2-aminoethyl)-15-benzyl-3-(1-hydroxyethyl)-12-(2-methylpropyl)-2,5,8,11,14,17,20-heptaoxo-1,4,7,10,13,16,19-heptazacyclotricos-21-yl]amino]butan-2-yl]amino]-3-hydroxy-1-oxobutan-2-yl]amino]-1-oxobutan-2-yl]-6-methyloctanamide
- CAS Number: 1405-20-5
- PubChem CID: 5702105
- DrugBank: DB00781
- UNII: 19371312D4
- ChEMBL: ChEMBL1201283
- NIAID ChemDB: 007797
- CompTox Dashboard (EPA): DTXSID5045839
- ECHA InfoCard: 100.014.340

Chemical and physical data
- Formula: C_{56}H_{100}N_{16}O_{17}S
- Molar mass: 1301.57 g·mol^{−1}

Polymyxin B, sold under the brand name Poly-Rx among others, is an antibiotic used to treat meningitis, pneumonia, sepsis, and urinary tract infections. While it is useful for many Gram negative infections, it is not useful for Gram positive infections. It can be given by injection into a vein, muscle, or cerebrospinal fluid or inhaled. The injectable form is generally only used if other options are not available. It is also available as the combinations bacitracin/‌polymyxin B and neomycin/‌polymyxin B/‌bacitracin for use on the skin.

Common side effects when given by injection include kidney problems, neurological problems, fever, itchiness, and rash. Injections into muscle may result in significant pain. Other serious side effects may include fungal infections, anaphylaxis, and muscle weakness. It is unclear if use during pregnancy is safe for the baby. Polymyxin B works by breaking down the cytoplasmic membrane which generally results in bacterial cell death.

Polymyxin B was approved for medical use in the United States in 1964. It is on the World Health Organization's List of Essential Medicines. It is available as a generic medication. In the European Union it is only approved to be applied to the skin as of 2015. It is derived from the bacterium Paenibacillus polymyxa (formerly known as Bacillus polymyxa). In 2023, the combination of polymyxin B with dexamethasone and neomycin was the 260th most commonly prescribed medication in the United States, with more than 1 million prescriptions.

== Medical uses ==
=== Spectrum of susceptibility ===
Polymyxin B has been used to treat urinary tract infections and meningitis caused by Pseudomonas aeruginosa and Haemophilus influenzae, respectively. The following represents MIC susceptibility data for a few medically significant microorganisms.

- Haemophilus influenzae: ≥0.8 μg/mL
- Pseudomonas aeruginosa: 0.25–1 μg/mL

=== Endotoxin adsorption ===
An effective use of polymyxin B is found in patients with refractory septic shock, that is, without positive outcome to the administration of standard treatments (increase in volemia and other antibiotics). The obstacle of the toxicity of polymyxin B is bypassed by extracorporeal circulation with perfusion of venous blood through a cartridge on whose fibers polymyxin B is covalently fixed; in this way the antibiotic exerts its bactericidal function but is not released into the blood since it remains fully attached to the fiber. Through this perfusion the cartridge retains the endotoxin, recognized as the trigger of septic shock. The treatment of the cartridge to polymyxin B (Toraymyxin, medical device designed and produced by the Japanese Toray), takes place in two sessions of two hours each, carried out at a distance of 24 hours.

== Mechanism of action ==
1. Alters bacterial outer membrane permeability by binding to a negatively charged site in the lipopolysaccharide layer, which has an electrostatic attraction for the positively charged amino groups in the cyclic peptide portion (this site normally is a binding site for calcium and magnesium counter ions); the result is a destabilized outer membrane
2. Fatty acid portion dissolves in hydrophobic region of cytoplasmic membrane and disrupts membrane integrity
3. Leakage of cellular molecules, inhibition of cellular respiration
4. Binds and inactivates endotoxin
5. Relative absence of selective toxicity: nonspecific for cell membranes of any type, highly toxic.

Removal of the hydrophobic tail of polymyxin B yields polymyxin nonapeptide (PMBN), which still binds to LPS, but no longer kills the bacterial cell. However, it still detectably increases the permeability of the bacterial cell wall to other antibiotics, indicating that it still causes some degree of membrane disorganization.

== Mixture composition ==
Polymyxin B is composed of polymyxins B1, B1-I, B2, B3, and B6. Polymyxins B1 and B2 are considered major components. These related components are structurally identical with the exception of a variable fatty acid group on each fraction. Results from in vitro studies have shown marginal differences in MIC data when comparing the fractions.

== Research application ==
Polymyxin B is also used to induce envelope stress in order to study the organisms' response to such stress. Polymyxin envelope stress assays such as this have been used for the study of small RNA (sRNA) responses in Salmonella enterica.
