= Clavam =

Class of antibiotics

Clavulanic acid

Clavams are a class of β-lactam antibiotics. These antibiotics are derived from Streptomyces clavuligerus NRRL 3585. This class is divided into the clavulanic acid class and the 5S clavams class. Both groups are the outcomes of the fermentation process produced by Streptomyces spp. Clavulanic acid is a broad-spectrum antibiotic and 5S clavams may have anti-fungal properties. They are similar to penams, but with an oxygen substituted for the sulfur. Thus, they are also known as oxapenams.

An example is clavulanic acid, from which this compound class receives its name.

Clavulanic acid, a type of clavam, has antibiotic properties. It can be used as a medication to treat a variety of bacterial infections. Clavam tablets may be effective for short-term treatment of bronchitis, cystitis, sinusitis, otitis media, or skin infections. Clavams are commonly used in conjunction with other antibiotics such as amoxicillin to produce a broader therapeutic effect. "One of the most valuable multipurpose and incredible trade of antibiotics is the β-lactams group.

Clavulanic acid strongly inhibits β-lactamase in bacteria, which is associated with its antibiotic properties. β-Lactam antibiotics generally have a common feature which is the 3-carbon and 1-nitrogen ring (β-lactam ring) that is highly reactive. Different molecules of the Clavam class have been shown to inhibit the action of several fungal species. 5S clavams do not have an inhibitory effect on β-lactamase, but are involved in methionine biosynthesis inhibition, making them bacteriostatic agents. Additionally, 5S Clavams may have inhibitory effects on RNA synthesis, which is a common property of anti-fungal medications. Clavams have wide-ranging bioactivity, and may have greater therapeutic use than current research indicates. Because of their activity on β-lactamase, this class of antibiotics can evade antibiotic resistance in bacteria, which is a risk associated with other antibiotics such as penicillins.

== Regulation of clavam-biosynthesis in S. clavuligerus ==
In S. Clavuligerus infection, a Streptomyces antibiotic regulatory protein known as cephamycin and clavulanic acid regulator (CcaR) is encoded into the cephamycin gene cluster. This is essential for the cephamycin C and clavulanic acid, but not the 5S claims. CcaR is important for the expression of polycistronic transcripts, which are early genes for clavulanic acid biosynthesis. This is also a key factor for activating its own transcription by binding to its own promoting region.
