= Inger Andersson (biochemist) =

Swedish biochemist and molecular biophysicist

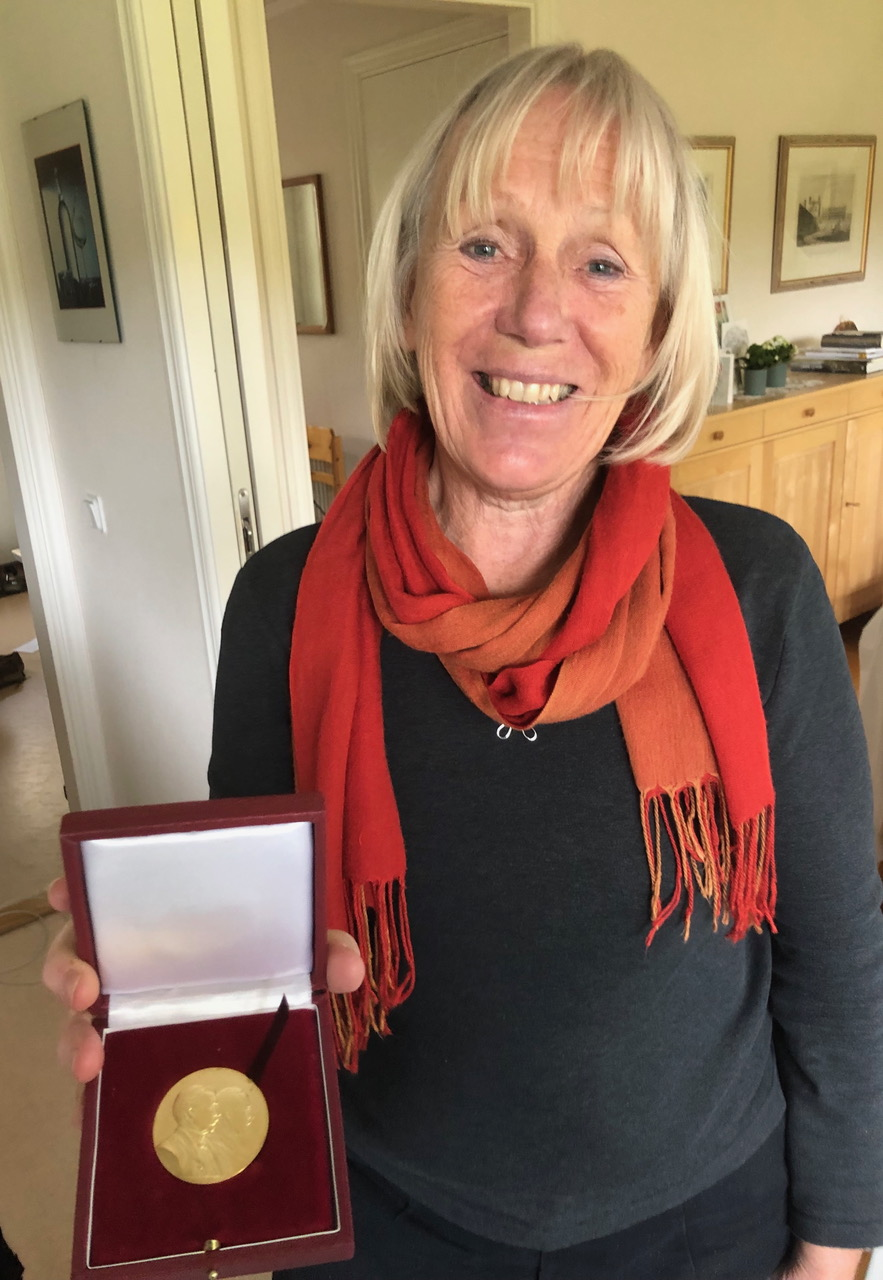
- Andersson with the Norblad-Ekstrand Medal in 2019
- Born: Inger Agneta Andersson; August 8, 1949 (age 77); Gävle, Sweden
- Education: Uppsala University; Saarland University
- Known for: RuBisCO structural biology; photosynthetic carbon fixation; mononuclear iron enzymes; β-lactam biosynthesis
- Awards: Norblad-Ekstrand Medal (2019); Dr. Eduard Martin Prize (1980)
- Scientific career
- Fields: Biochemistry, structural biology, molecular biophysics, photosynthesis
- Workplaces: Swedish University of Agricultural Sciences; Uppsala University; Stanford University

Inger Agneta Andersson (born 8 August 1949) is a Swedish biochemist and molecular biophysicist known for structural and mechanistic studies of RuBisCO and other enzymes. Her research has contributed to understanding photosynthetic carbon fixation and the structure and mechanism of mononuclear iron enzymes involved in β-lactam antibiotic biosynthesis. She is professor emerita in the Molecular Biophysics programme at Uppsala University.

== Education and academic career ==
Andersson was born in Gävle in 1949. She received a PhD in biochemistry from Saarland University in 1980. The same year, she joined the Swedish University of Agricultural Sciences (SLU) and the Biomedical Centre in Uppsala. She became professor of plant biochemistry at SLU in 1997 and, from 2006, also held a professorship at Stanford University. She is currently affiliated with Molecular Biophysics at Uppsala University as professor emerita.

== Research ==
=== Rubisco and photosynthetic carbon fixation ===
Andersson's best-known work concerns the structure and mechanism of ribulose-1,5-bisphosphate carboxylase/oxygenase (Rubisco), the enzyme responsible for the incorporation of atmospheric carbon dioxide into the carbon-fixation pathway of photosynthesis. In 1989, she was first author of a Nature paper reporting the crystal structure of the Rubisco active site. The authors noted that the structure provided a basis for understanding catalysis and for attempts to improve the enzyme by genetic engineering. Her subsequent Rubisco research included structures of activated enzyme, substrate and product complexes, studies of conformational changes during activation and ligand binding, and structural comparisons between Rubiscos from plants and photosynthetic microorganisms.

Andersson was later corresponding author of studies on Rubisco complexes and comparative enzyme structures, including work on green-algal and diatom Rubiscos. Her research was also synthesised in major reviews of Rubisco structure, catalysis and regulation. Independent reviews have continued to use this structural framework in discussions of Rubisco catalysis and engineering. A 2023 review in the Annual Review of Biochemistry, examining Rubisco function, evolution and engineering through the lens of structure and mechanism, cites Andersson's 1996 high-resolution Rubisco structure among the structural literature underlying the field. Reviews of Rubisco improvement have likewise discussed structural and catalytic constraints in the context of strategies for crop improvement.

=== Mononuclear iron enzymes and β-lactam biosynthesis ===
Andersson also contributed to structural studies of mononuclear iron enzymes involved in the biosynthesis of β-lactam antibiotics. In 1995, she was a co-author of a Nature paper reporting the crystal structure of isopenicillin N synthase. The paper described the structure as the first from a new structural family of enzymes and identified a conserved jelly-roll motif shared with several 2-oxoacid-dependent oxygenases. In 1998, Andersson was corresponding author of a Nature paper reporting the structure of deacetoxycephalosporin C synthase, a mononuclear ferrous 2-oxoacid-dependent oxygenase that expands the penicillin nucleus to form the cephalosporin nucleus. The study reported the first crystal structure of a 2-oxoacid-dependent oxygenase and proposed a mechanism for formation of the reactive ferryl intermediate used in catalysis.

== Recognition ==
In 2019, Andersson received the Norblad-Ekstrand Medal from the Swedish Chemical Society for research on photosynthetic carbon dioxide fixation. The Society states that the medal is awarded to people who have distinguished themselves through outstanding scientific research in chemistry and its border sciences.

== Selected publications ==
- Andersson, I. et al. "Crystal structure of the active site of ribulose-bisphosphate carboxylase". Nature 337, 229–234 (1989).
- Roach, P. L. et al. "Crystal structure of isopenicillin N synthase is the first from a new structural family of enzymes". Nature 375, 700–704 (1995).
- Valegård, K. et al. "Structure of a cephalosporin synthase". Nature 394, 805–809 (1998).
- Andersson, I. & Taylor, T. C. "Structural framework for catalysis and regulation in ribulose-1,5-bisphosphate carboxylase/oxygenase". Archives of Biochemistry and Biophysics 414, 130–140 (2003).
- Andersson, I. "Catalysis and regulation in Rubisco". Journal of Experimental Botany 59, 1555–1568 (2008).
