= Β-Lactam antibiotic =

Class of broad-spectrum antibiotics

β-Lactam antibiotic
- Drug class
- Core structure of penicillins (top) and cephalosporins (bottom) the 2 most common groups of β-lactam antibiotics . β-lactam ring in red.

Class identifiers
- Use: Bacterial infection
- ATC code: J01C
- Biological target: Penicillin binding protein

External links
- MeSH: D047090

Legal status

β-Lactam antibiotics (beta-lactam antibiotics) are antibiotics that contain a β-lactam ring in their chemical structure. This includes penicillin derivatives (penams), cephalosporins and cephamycins (cephems), monobactams, carbapenems and carbacephems. Most β-lactam antibiotics work by inhibiting cell wall biosynthesis in the bacterial organism and are the most widely used group of antibiotics. Until 2003, when measured by sales, more than half of all commercially available antibiotics in use were β-lactam compounds. The first β-lactam antibiotic discovered, penicillin, was isolated from a strain of Penicillium rubens (named as Penicillium notatum at the time).

Bacteria often develop resistance to β-lactam antibiotics by synthesizing a β-lactamase, an enzyme that attacks the β-lactam ring. To overcome this resistance, β-lactam antibiotics can be given with β-lactamase inhibitors such as clavulanic acid.

== Medical use ==
β-Lactam antibiotics are indicated for the prevention and treatment of bacterial infections caused by susceptible organisms. At first, β-lactam antibiotics were mainly active only against gram-positive bacteria, yet the recent development of broad-spectrum β-lactam antibiotics active against various gram-negative organisms has increased their usefulness.

In uninflamed (normal) brain meninges, the penetration of beta-lactam antibiotics is low, at 0.15 of AUC_{CSF}/AUC_{S} ratio (the ratio of area under curve of cerebrosopinal fluid against area under curve of serum).

== Adverse effects ==
=== Adverse drug reactions ===
Common adverse drug reactions for the β-lactam antibiotics include diarrhea, nausea, rash, urticaria, superinfection (including candidiasis).

Infrequent adverse effects include fever, vomiting, erythema, dermatitis, angioedema, pseudomembranous colitis.

Pain and inflammation at the injection site is also common for parenterally administered β-lactam antibiotics.

=== Allergy/hypersensitivity ===
Immunologically mediated adverse reactions to any β-lactam antibiotic may occur in up to 10% of patients receiving that agent (a small fraction of which are truly IgE-mediated allergic reactions, see amoxicillin rash). Anaphylaxis will occur in approximately 0.01% of patients. A historically cited 5–10% cross-sensitivity exists between penicillin-derivatives, cephalosporins, and carbapenems. Various investigators challenge this overestimate. For cephalosporins, recent studies identify a true cross-reactivity rate of approximately 2% or less. The rate for carbapenems is less than 1%.

Nevertheless, the risk of cross-reactivity is sufficient to warrant the contraindication of all β-lactam antibiotics in patients with a history of severe allergic reactions (urticaria, anaphylaxis, interstitial nephritis) to any β-lactam antibiotic. Rarely, allergic reactions have been triggered by exposure from kissing and sexual contact with a partner who is taking these antibiotics.

A Jarisch–Herxheimer reaction may occur after initial treatment of a spirochetal infection such as syphilis with a β-lactam antibiotic.

== Mechanism of action ==
=== Inhibition of cell wall synthesis ===
Penicillin and most other β-lactam antibiotics act by inhibiting penicillin-binding proteins, which normally catalyze cross-linking of bacterial cell walls.

In the absence of β-lactam antibiotics (left), the cell wall plays an important role in bacterial reproduction. Bacteria attempting to grow and divide in the presence of β-lactam antibiotics (right) fail to do so, and instead shed their cell walls, forming osmotically fragile spheroplasts.

β-Lactam antibiotics are bactericidal, and act by inhibiting the synthesis of the peptidoglycan layer of bacterial cell walls. The peptidoglycan layer is important for cell wall structural integrity, especially in gram-positive organisms, being the outermost and primary component of the wall. The final transpeptidation step in the synthesis of the peptidoglycan is facilitated by DD-transpeptidases, also known as penicillin binding proteins (PBPs). PBPs vary in their affinity for penicillin and other β-lactam antibiotics. The number of PBPs varies between bacterial species.

β-Lactam antibiotics are analogues of d-alanyl-d-alanine—the terminal amino acid residues on the precursor NAM/NAG-peptide subunits of the nascent peptidoglycan layer. The structural similarity between β-lactam antibiotics and d-alanyl-d-alanine facilitates their binding to the active site of PBPs. The β-lactam nucleus of the molecule irreversibly binds to (acylates) the Ser_{62} residue of the PBP active site. This irreversible inhibition of the PBPs prevents the final crosslinking (transpeptidation) of the nascent peptidoglycan layer, disrupting cell wall synthesis. β-Lactam antibiotics block not only the division of bacteria, including cyanobacteria, but also the division of cyanelles, the photosynthetic organelles of the glaucophytes, and the division of chloroplasts of bryophytes. In contrast, they have no effect on the plastids of the highly developed vascular plants. This is supporting the endosymbiotic theory and indicates an evolution of plastid division in land plants.

Under normal circumstances, peptidoglycan precursors signal a reorganisation of the bacterial cell wall and, as a consequence, trigger the activation of autolytic cell wall hydrolases. Inhibition of cross-linkage by β-lactams causes a build-up of peptidoglycan precursors, which triggers the digestion of existing peptidoglycan by autolytic hydrolases without the production of new peptidoglycan. As a result, the bactericidal action of β-lactam antibiotics is further enhanced.

=== Guanine oxidation ===
Another possibility that has been proposed to account for much of the cytotoxicity of β-lactams focuses on the oxidation of the guanine nucleotide in the bacterial nucleotide pool. The incorporation of oxidized guanine nucleotide into DNA could cause cytotoxicity. Bacterial cytotoxicity could arise from incomplete repair of closely spaced 8-oxo-2'-deoxyguanosine lesions in the DNA resulting in double-strand breaks.

== Potency ==
Two structural features of β-lactam antibiotics have been correlated with their antibiotic potency. The first is known as "Woodward's parameter", h, and is the height (in angstroms) of the pyramid formed by the nitrogen atom of the β-lactam as the apex and the three adjacent carbon atoms as the base. The second is called "Cohen's parameter", c, and is the distance between the carbon atom of the carboxylate and the oxygen atom of the β-lactam carbonyl. This distance is thought to correspond to the distance between the carboxylate-binding site and the oxyanion hole of the PBP enzyme. The best antibiotics are those with higher h values (more reactive to hydrolysis) and lower c values (better binding to PBPs).

== Modes of resistance ==
By definition, all β-lactam antibiotics have a β-lactam ring in their structure. The effectiveness of these antibiotics relies on their ability to reach the PBP intact and their ability to bind to the PBP. Hence, there are two main modes of bacterial resistance to β-lactams: enzymatic hydrolysis of the β-lactam ring and possession of altered penicillin-binding proteins.

=== Enzymatic hydrolysis of the β-lactam ring ===
If the bacterium produces the enzyme β-lactamase or the enzyme penicillinase, the enzyme will hydrolyse the β-lactam ring of the antibiotic, rendering the antibiotic ineffective. (An example of such an enzyme is New Delhi metallo-beta-lactamase 1, discovered in 2009.) The genes encoding these enzymes may be inherently present on the bacterial chromosome or may be acquired via plasmid transfer (plasmid-mediated resistance), and β-lactamase gene expression may be induced by exposure to β-lactams.

Clavulanic acid

Amoxicillin

The production of a β-lactamase by a bacterium does not necessarily rule out all treatment options with β-lactam antibiotics. In some instances, β-lactam antibiotics may be co-administered with a β-lactamase inhibitor. For example, Augmentin (FGP) is made of amoxicillin (a β-lactam antibiotic) and clavulanic acid (a β-lactamase inhibitor). The clavulanic acid is designed to overwhelm all β-lactamase enzymes, and effectively are an antagonist so that the amoxicillin is not affected by the β-lactamase enzymes. Another β-lactam/β-lactamase inhibitor combination is piperacillin/tazobactam with a broad spectrum of antibacterial activity that includes gram-positive and -negative aerobic and anaerobic bacteria. The addition of tazobactam to piperacillin has enhanced its stability against a wide range of β-lactamase enzymes including some Extended-Spectrum β-lactamases.

Other β-lactamase inhibitors such as boronic acids are being studied in which they irreversibly bind to the active site of β-lactamases. This is a benefit over clavulanic acid and similar β-lactam competitors, because they cannot be hydrolysed, and therefore rendered useless. Extensive research is currently being done to develop tailored boronic acids to target different isozymes of beta-lactamases.

However, in all cases where infection with β-lactamase-producing bacteria is suspected, the choice of a suitable β-lactam antibiotic should be carefully considered prior to treatment. In particular, choosing appropriate β-lactam antibiotic therapy is of utmost importance against organisms which harbor some level of β-lactamase expression. In this case, failure to use the most appropriate β-lactam antibiotic therapy at the onset of treatment could result in selection for bacteria with higher levels of β-lactamase expression, thereby making further efforts with other β-lactam antibiotics more difficult.

In the context of medical pharmacology, penicillins, cephalosporins, and carbapenems, while all have the β-lactam ring that is the fundamental structure, also have an auxiliary ring that carries a carboxylate group that is positioned on the same side as the carbonyl group within the β-lactam ring, and, as such, this structural configuration is critical to their antimicrobial activity. Bacterial resistance to these antibiotics primarily occurs through the production of β-lactamases, enzymes that hydrolyze the amide bond of the β-lactam ring, thereby eliminating the antimicrobial activity of these antibiotics. This resistance mechanism highlights the importance of the structural integrity of the β-lactam ring for the antibiotic's function. The color change from colorless or light yellow to amber or even red in an aqueous solution of a β-lactam antibiotic can denote β-lactamase hydrolysis of amide bonds in the β-lactam ring. This is often observed with a chromogenic β-lactamase substrate like ceftriaxone, merapenem, or nitrocefin, that undergoes a distinctive color change from yellow to red as the amide bond in the β-lactam ring is hydrolyzed by β-lactamase. This color change is a visual indicator of the presence and activity of β-lactamase enzymes, which are responsible for conferring resistance to β-lactam antibiotics in many bacterial species. The hydrolysis of the β-lactam ring by β-lactamase enzymes renders the antibiotic ineffective, thereby allowing the bacteria to survive in the presence of the antibiotic. Some β-lactam antibiotics like ceftriaxone and meropenem are known to be relatively unstable in solution, especially when stored for extended periods, and degrade in an aqueous solution even without the presence of β-lactamase. For ceftriaxone, the color of solutions can range from light yellow to amber, depending on the length of storage, concentration, and diluent used. A study found that meropenem concentrations dropped to 90% of the initial concentration at 7.4 hours at 22°C and 5.7 hours at 33°C, indicating degradation over time.

=== Possession of altered penicillin-binding proteins ===
As a response to the use of β-lactams to control bacterial infections, some bacteria have evolved penicillin binding proteins with novel structures. β-Lactam antibiotics cannot bind as effectively to these altered PBPs, and, as a result, the β-lactams are less effective at disrupting cell wall synthesis. Notable examples of this mode of resistance include methicillin-resistant Staphylococcus aureus (MRSA) and penicillin-resistant Streptococcus pneumoniae. Altered PBPs do not necessarily rule out all treatment options with β-lactam antibiotics.

== Nomenclature ==
The β-lactam core structures. (A) A penam. (B) A carbapenam. (C) An oxapenam. (D) A penem. (E) A carbapenem. (F) A monobactam. (G) A cephem. (H) A carbacephem. (I) An oxacephem.

β-Lactams are classified according to their core ring structures.

- β-Lactams fused to saturated five-membered rings:
  - β-Lactams containing thiazolidine rings are named penams.
  - β-Lactams containing pyrrolidine rings are named carbapenams.
  - β-Lactams fused to oxazolidine rings are named oxapenams or clavams.
- β-Lactams fused to unsaturated five-membered rings:
  - β-Lactams containing 2,3-dihydrothiazole rings are named penems.
  - β-Lactams containing 2,3-dihydro-1H-pyrrole rings are named carbapenems.
- β-Lactams fused to unsaturated six-membered rings:
  - β-Lactams containing 3,6-dihydro-2H-1,3-thiazine rings are named cephems.
  - β-Lactams containing 1,2,3,4-tetrahydropyridine rings are named carbacephems.
  - β-Lactams containing 3,6-dihydro-2H-1,3-oxazine rings are named oxacephems.
- β-Lactams not fused to any other ring are named monobactams.

By convention, the bicyclic β-lactams are numbered starting with the position occupied by sulfur in the penams and cephems, regardless of which atom it is in a given class. That is, position 1 is always adjacent to the β-carbon of β-lactam ring. The numbering continues clockwise from position one until the β-carbon of β-lactam is reached, at which point numbering continues counterclockwise around the lactam ring to number the remaining to carbons. For example, the nitrogen atom of all bicyclic β-lactams fused to five-membered rings is labelled position 4, as it is in penams, while in cephems, the nitrogen is position 5.

The numbering of monobactams follows that of the IUPAC; the nitrogen atom is position 1, the carbonyl carbon is 2, the α-carbon is 3, and the β-carbon 4.

== Biosynthesis ==
To date, two distinct methods of biosynthesizing the β-lactam core of this family of antibiotics have been discovered. The first pathway discovered was that of the penams and cephems. This path begins with a nonribosomal peptide synthetase (NRPS), ACV synthetase (ACVS), which generates the linear tripeptide δ-(L-α-aminoadipyl)-L-cysteine-D-valine (ACV). ACV is oxidatively cyclized (two cyclizations by a single enzyme) to bicyclic intermediate isopenicillin N by isopenicillin N synthase (IPNS) to form the penam core structure. Various transamidations lead to the different natural penicillins.

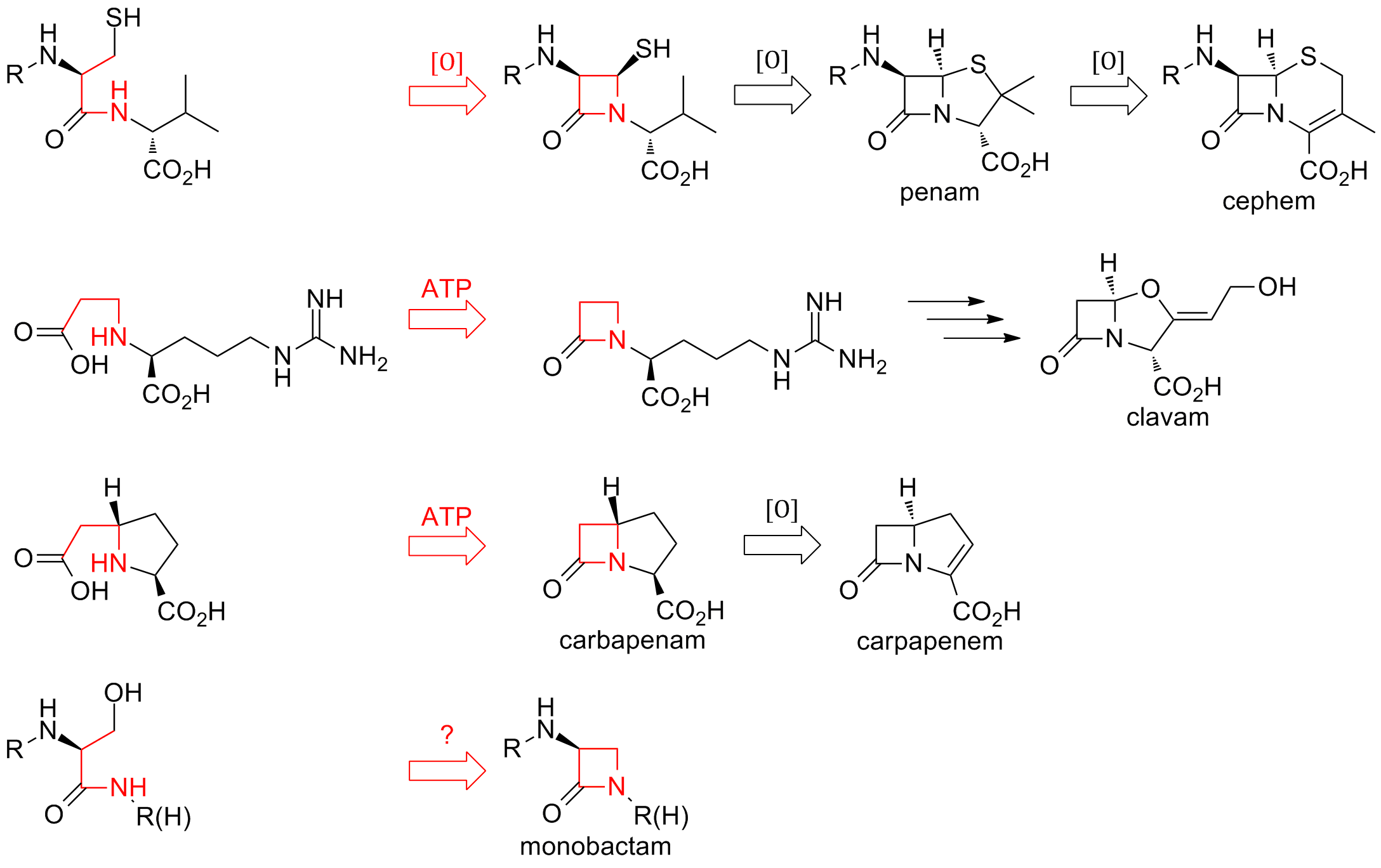
This figure outlines the different methods of β-lactam closure among the various classes of β-lactam compounds. Penams and cephems are cyclized oxidatively (first row); clavams and carbapenems are closed by ATP-utilizing amidation (second and third row); and some monobactams may be closed by a third method (fourth row).

The biosynthesis of cephems branch off at isopenicillin N by an oxidative ring expansion to the cephem core. As with the penams, the variety of cephalosporins and cephamycins come from different transamidations, as is the case for the penicillins.

While the ring closure in penams and cephems is between positions 1 and 4 of the β-lactam and is oxidative, the clavams and carbapenems have their rings closed between positions 1 and 2 of the ring. β-lactam synthetases are responsible for these cyclizations, and the carboxylate of the open-ring substrates is activated by ATP. In clavams, the β-lactam is formed prior to the second ring; in carbapenems, the β-lactam ring is closed second in sequence.

The biosynthesis of the β-lactam ring of tabtoxin mirrors that of the clavams and carbapenems. The closure of the lactam ring in the other monobactams, such as sulfazecin and the nocardicins, may involve a third mechanism involving inversion of configuration at the β-carbon.

== See also ==
- List of β-lactam antibiotics
- ATC code J01C Beta-lactam antibacterials, penicillins
- ATC code J01D Other beta-lactam antibacterials
- Bacteria
- Cell wall
- Discovery and development of cephalosporins
- History of penicillin
- Nitrocefin
