= Oxacephem =

Class of pharmaceutical drugs

Latamoxef

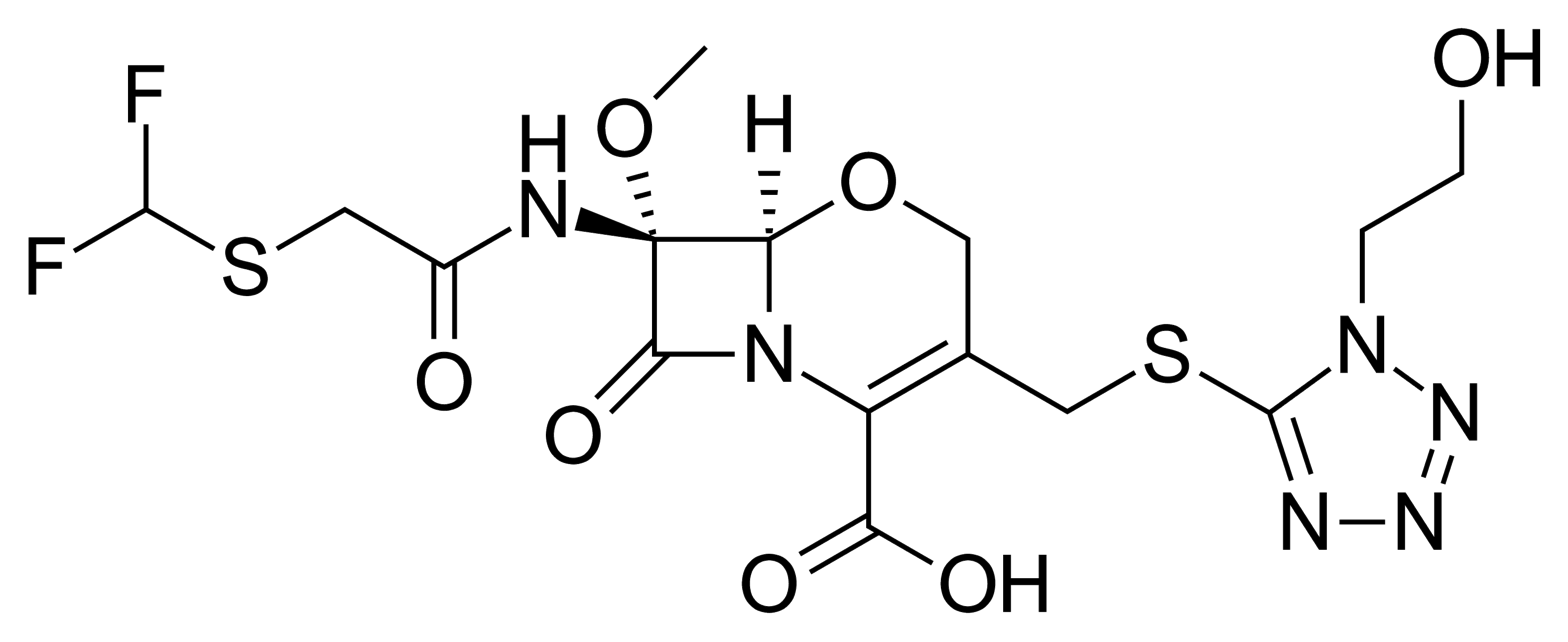
Flomoxef

An oxacephem is a β-lactam molecule similar to a cephem, but with an oxygen substituted for the sulfur. They are synthetic compounds not seen in nature, generally used as β-lactam antibiotics. Examples include Latamoxef and Flomoxef.
