= ArgJ protein family =

ArgJ
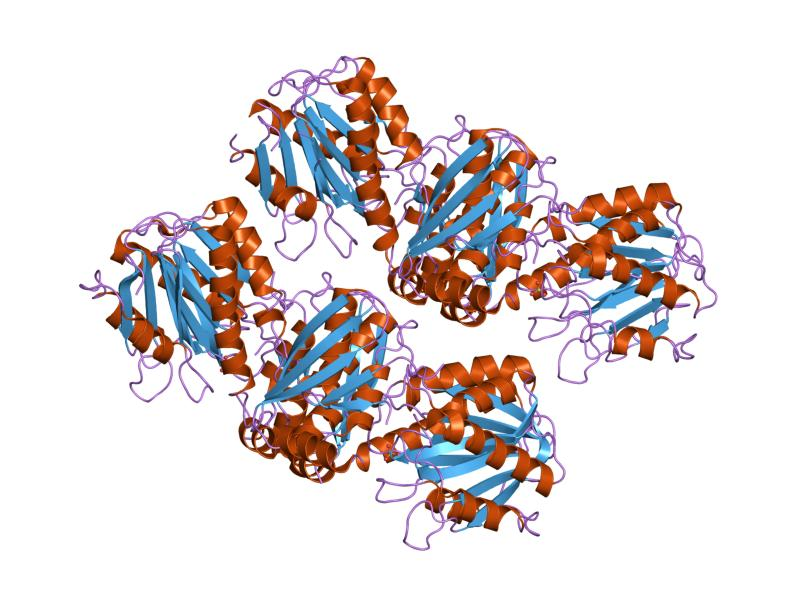
- ornithine acetyltransferase (orf6 gene product - clavulanic acid biosynthesis) from streptomyces clavuligerus

Identifiers
- Symbol: ArgJ
- Pfam: PF01960
- InterPro: IPR002813
- CDD: cd02152
Available protein structures:
- PDB: IPR002813 PF01960 (ECOD; PDBsum)
- AlphaFold: IPR002813; PF01960

In molecular biology, members of the ArgJ protein family are bifunctional protein that catalyses the first (EC 2.3.1.35) and fifth steps (EC 2.3.1.1) in arginine biosynthesis. The structure has been determined for glutamate N-acetyltransferase 2 (ornithine acetyltransferase), an ArgJ-like protein from Streptomyces clavuligerus.
