= Clavaminate synthase =

Class of enzymes

Identifiers
- EC no.: 1.14.11.21
- CAS no.: 122799-56-8

Databases
- BRENDA: enzyme data
- ExPASy: NiceZyme view
- KEGG: enzyme entry
- MetaCyc: metabolic pathway
- Rhea: reactions
- PDB structures: RCSB PDB PDBe PDBsum
Search
- PMC: articles
- PubMed: articles
- NCBI: proteins

Clavaminate synthase (EC 1.14.11.21, clavaminate synthase 2, clavaminic acid synthase) is an enzyme characterised from Streptomyces clavuligerus with systematic name deoxyamidinoproclavaminate,2-oxoglutarate:oxygen oxidoreductase (3-hydroxylating). It is a non-heme iron protein that catalyses a sequence of three oxidation reactions in the bosynthesis of the beta-lactamase inhibitor, clavulanic acid. The first of these converts deoxyguanidinoproclavaminic acid to amidinoproclavaminic acid:

deoxyguanidinoproclavaminic acid
O_{2}
H_{2}O
amidinoproclavaminic acid
+ CO_{2}

The enzyme simultaneously converts α-ketoglutaric acid to succinic acid, which drives the reaction by releasing carbon dioxide.

After this step, the enzyme proclavaminate amidinohydrolase converts amidinoproclavaminic acid to proclavaminic acid by hydrolysis at the guanidine group, with urea as byproduct:

amidinoproclavaminic acid
amidinohydrolase
H_{2}O
proclavaminic acid
+
urea

Proclavaminic acid goes on to two further oxidative steps, each dependent on α-ketoglutaric acid consumption:

proclavaminic acid
O_{2}
H_{2}O
dihydroclavaminic acid
+ CO_{2}
dihydroclavaminic acid
O_{2}
H_{2}O
clavaminic acid
+ CO_{2}

Clavulanic acid

Clavaminic acid is then further elaborated to give clavulanic acid as the final product in the biosynthetic pathway.
