= Flomoxef =

Chemical compound

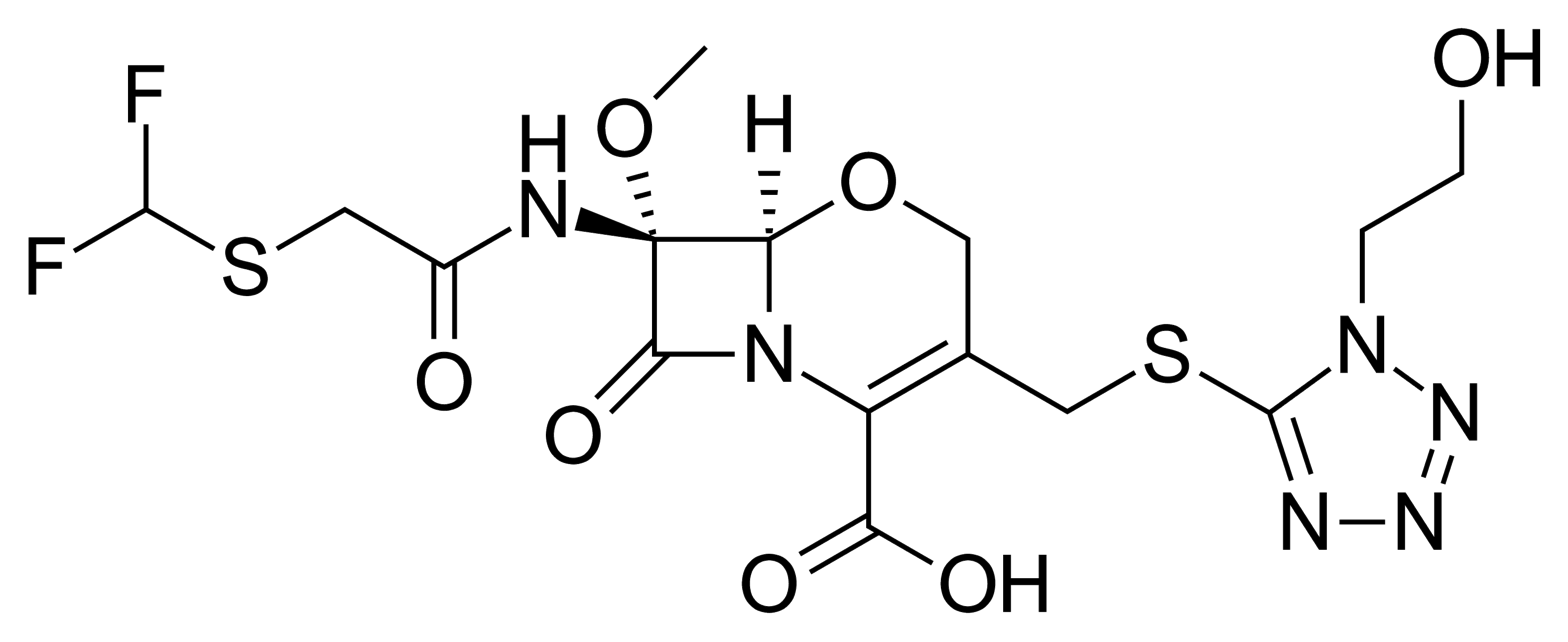

Clinical data
- Trade names: Flumarin
- AHFS/Drugs.com: International Drug Names
- ATC code: J01DC14 (WHO)

Identifiers
- IUPAC name: (6R,7R)-7-[[2-(Difluoromethylsulfanyl)acetyl]amino]-3-[[1-(2-hydroxyethyl)tetrazol-5-yl]sulfanylmethyl]-7-methoxy-8-oxo-5-oxa-1-azabicyclo[4.2.0]oct-2-ene-2-carboxylic acid
- CAS Number: 99665-00-6
- PubChem CID: 65864
- ChemSpider: 59274
- UNII: V9E5U5XF42
- KEGG: D07963
- ChEMBL: ChEMBL15413
- CompTox Dashboard (EPA): DTXSID5048845

Chemical and physical data
- Formula: C_{15}H_{18}F_{2}N_{6}O_{7}S_{2}
- Molar mass: 496.46 g·mol^{−1}
- 3D model (JSmol): Interactive image
- Melting point: 82.5 to 87.5 °C (180.5 to 189.5 °F)
- SMILES: CO[C@@]1([C@@H]2N(C1=O)C(=C(CO2)CSc3nnnn3CCO)C(=O)O)NC(=O)CSC(F)F
- InChI: InChI=1S/C15H18F2N6O7S2/c1-29-15(18-8(25)6-31-13(16)17)11(28)23-9(10(26)27)7(4-30-12(15)23)5-32-14-19-20-21-22(14)2-3-24/h12-13,24H,2-6H2,1H3,(H,18,25)(H,26,27)/t12-,15+/m1/s1; Key:UHRBTBZOWWGKMK-DOMZBBRYSA-N

Flomoxef is an oxacephem antibiotic that was developed by Shionogi.

It has been classified either as a second-generation or fourth-generation cephalosporin.

It was patented in 1982 and approved for medical use in 1988 under the trade name Flumarin.
