= Tunicamycin =

Names
- IUPAC name (E)-N-[(2S,3R,4R,5R,6R)-2-[(2R,3R,4R,5S,6R)- 3-acetamido-4,5-dihydroxy-6-(hydroxymethyl)oxan-2-yl]oxy- 6-[2-[(2R,3S,4R,5R)-5-(2,4-dioxopyrimidin-1-yl)- 3,4-dihydroxyoxolan-2-yl]-2-hydroxyethyl]-4,5-dihydroxyoxan- 3-yl]-5-methylhex-2-enamide
- Other names NSC 177382

Identifiers
CAS Number	11089-65-9
3D model (JSmol)	Interactive image
ChEMBL	ChEMBL505513
ChemSpider	24664016
ECHA InfoCard	100.115.295
EC Number	601-012-4
MeSH	Tunicamycin
PubChem CID	6433557
UNII	55W4525Q2E
CompTox Dashboard (EPA)	DTXSID8036730
- InChI: InChI=1S/C30H46N4O16/c1-11(2)5-4-6-16(38)32-19-23(43)20(40)14(47-29(19)50-28-18(31-12(3)36)22(42)21(41)15(10-35)48-28)9-13(37)26-24(44)25(45)27(49-26)34-8-7-17(39)33-30(34)46/h4,6-8,11,13-15,18-29,35,37,40-45H,5,9-10H2,1-3H3,(H,31,36)(H,32,38)(H,33,39,46)/b6-4+/t13?,14-,15-,18-,19-,20+,21-,22-,23-,24+,25-,26-,27-,28-,29+/m1/s1 Key: ZHSGGJXRNHWHRS-VIDYELAYSA-N
- SMILES: CC(C)C\C=C\C(=O)N[C@@H]1[C@H]([C@H]([C@H](O[C@H]1O[C@@H]2[C@@H]([C@H]([C@@H]([C@H](O2)CO)O)O)NC(=O)C)CC([C@@H]3[C@H]([C@H]([C@@H](O3)N4C=CC(=O)NC4=O)O)O)O)O)O

Properties
Chemical formula	C_{39}H_{64}N_{4}O_{16}
Molar mass	N/A

Hazards
- GHS labelling
Pictograms	(GHS06: Toxic)
Signal word	Danger
Hazard statements	H300
- Except where otherwise noted, data are given for materials in their standard state (at 25 °C [77 °F], 100 kPa). verify (what is ?) Infobox references

Tunicamycin is a mixture of homologous nucleoside antibiotics that inhibits the UDP-HexNAc: polyprenol-P HexNAc-1-P family of enzymes. In eukaryotes, this includes the enzyme GlcNAc phosphotransferase (GPT), which catalyzes the transfer of N-acetylglucosamine-1-phosphate from UDP-N-acetylglucosamine to dolichol phosphate in the first step of glycoprotein synthesis. Tunicamycin blocks N-linked glycosylation (N-glycans) and treatment of cultured human cells with tunicamycin causes cell cycle arrest in G1 phase. It is used as an experimental tool in biology, e.g. to induce unfolded protein response. Tunicamycin is produced by several bacteria, including Streptomyces clavuligerus and Streptomyces lysosuperificus.

Tunicamycin homologues have varying molecular weights owing to the variability in fatty acid side chain conjugates.

== Biosynthesis ==
The biosynthesis of tunicamycins was studied in Streptomyces chartreusis and a proposed biosynthetic pathway was characterized. The bacteria utilize the enzymes in the tun gene cluster (TunA-N) to make tunicamycins.

TunA uses the starter unit uridine diphosphate-N-acetyl-glucosamine (UDP-GlcNAc) and catalyzes the dehydration of the 6’ hydroxyl group. First, a Tyr residue in TunA abstracts a proton from the 4’ hydroxyl group, forming a ketone at that position. A hydride is subsequently abstracted from the 4’ carbon by NAD^{+}, forming NADH. The ketone is stabilized by hydrogen bonding from the Tyr residue, and a nearby Thr residue. A glutamate residue then abstracts a proton from the 5’ carbon, pushing the electrons up to form a double bond between the 5’ and 6’ carbon. A nearby cysteine donates a proton to the hydroxyl group as it leaves as water. NADH donates a hydride to the 4’ carbon, reforming a hydroxide in that position and forming UDP-6’-deoxy-5-6-ene-GlcNAc. TunF then catalyzes the epimerization of the intermediate to UDP-6’-deoxy-5-6-ene-GalNAc, changing the 4’ hydroxyl from the equatorial to axial position.

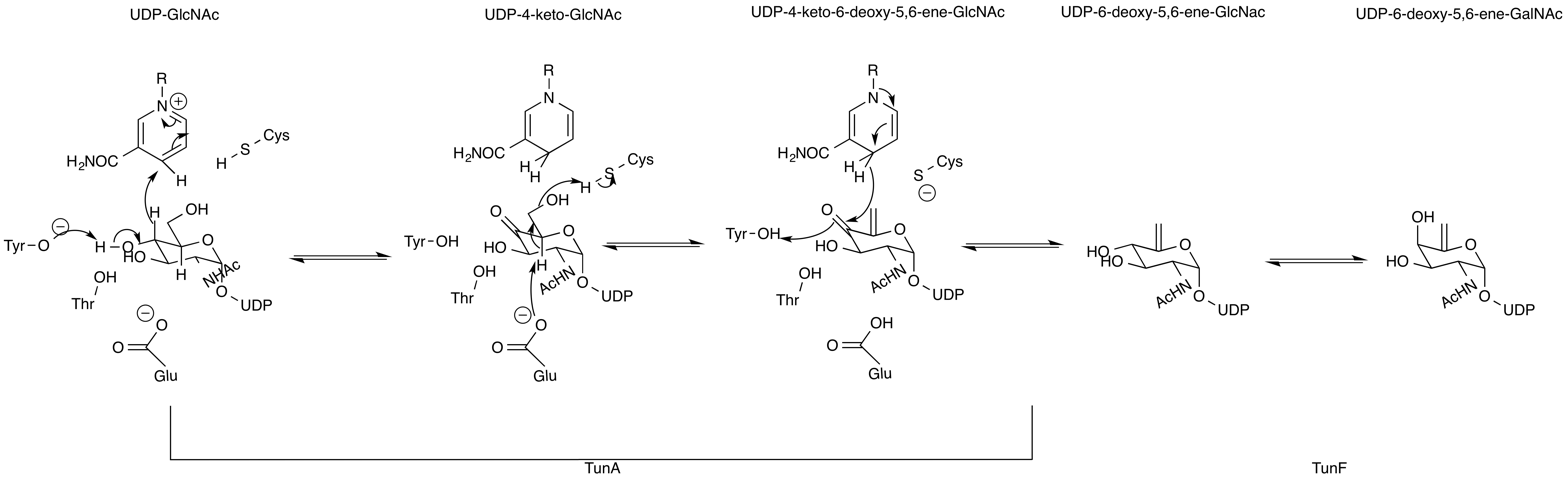

The other starter unit for tunicamycin is uridine, which is produced from uridine triphosphate (UTP). TunN is a nucleotide diphosphatase, and catalyzes the removal of pyrophosphate from UTP to form uridine monophosphate. The last phosphate is removed by the putative monophosphatase, TunG.

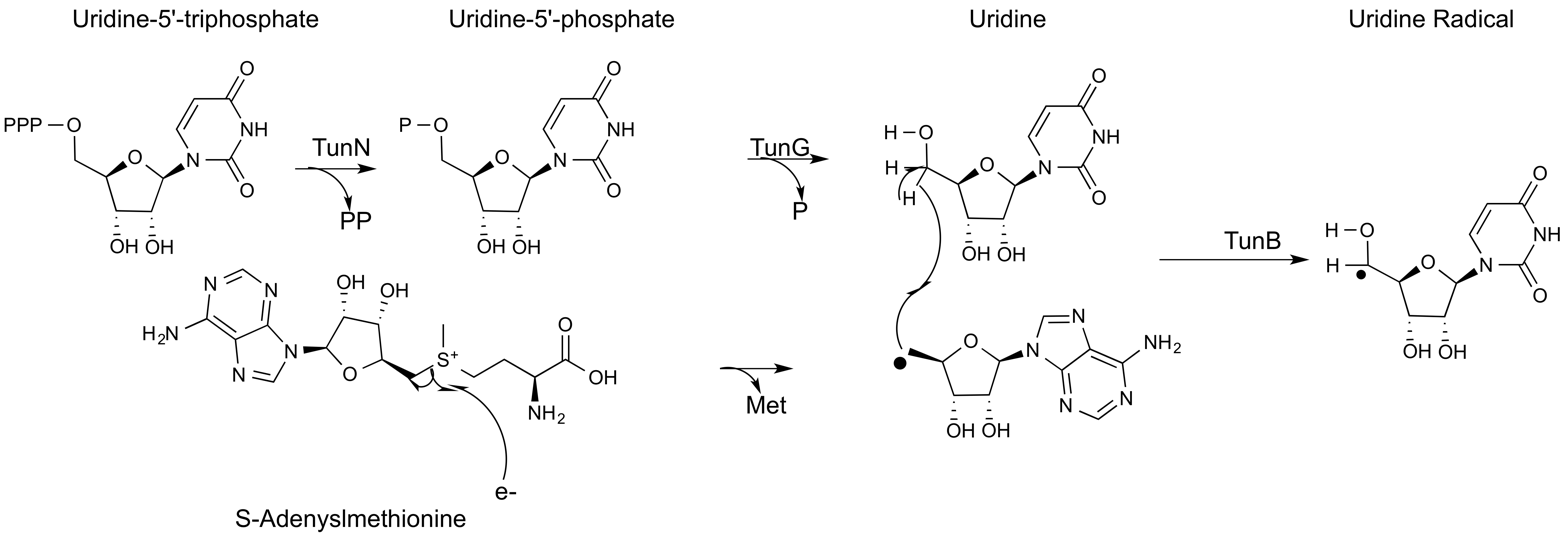

Once uridine and UDP-6’-deoxy-5-6-ene-GalNAc are produced, TunB catalyzes their linkage at the 6’ carbon of UDP-6’-deoxy-5-6-ene-GalNAc. TunB uses S-adenyslmethionine (SAM) to form a radical on the 5’ carbon of the ribose on uracil. TunM is thought to catalyze the formation of a new bond between the 5’ carbon of uridine and the 6’ carbon of UDP-6’-deoxy-5-6-ene-GalNAc using the electron from the uridine radical and one of the electrons from the double bond of UDP-6’-deoxy-5-6-ene-GalNAc. The radical on UDP-6’-deoxy-5-6-ene-GalNAc is then quenched by abstracting a hydrogen from SAM. The resulting molecule is UDP-N-acetyl-tunicamine. TunH then catalyzes the hydrolysis of UDP from UDP-N-acetyl-tunicamine. Another molecule of UDP-GlcNAc is introduced, and a β-1,1 glycosidic bond is subsequently formed, catalyzed by TunD. The resulting molecule is deacetylated by TunE. TunL and a fatty acyl-ACP ligase are used to load metabolic fatty acids onto the acyl carrier protein, TunK. TunC then attaches the fatty acid to the free amine, producing tunicamycin.

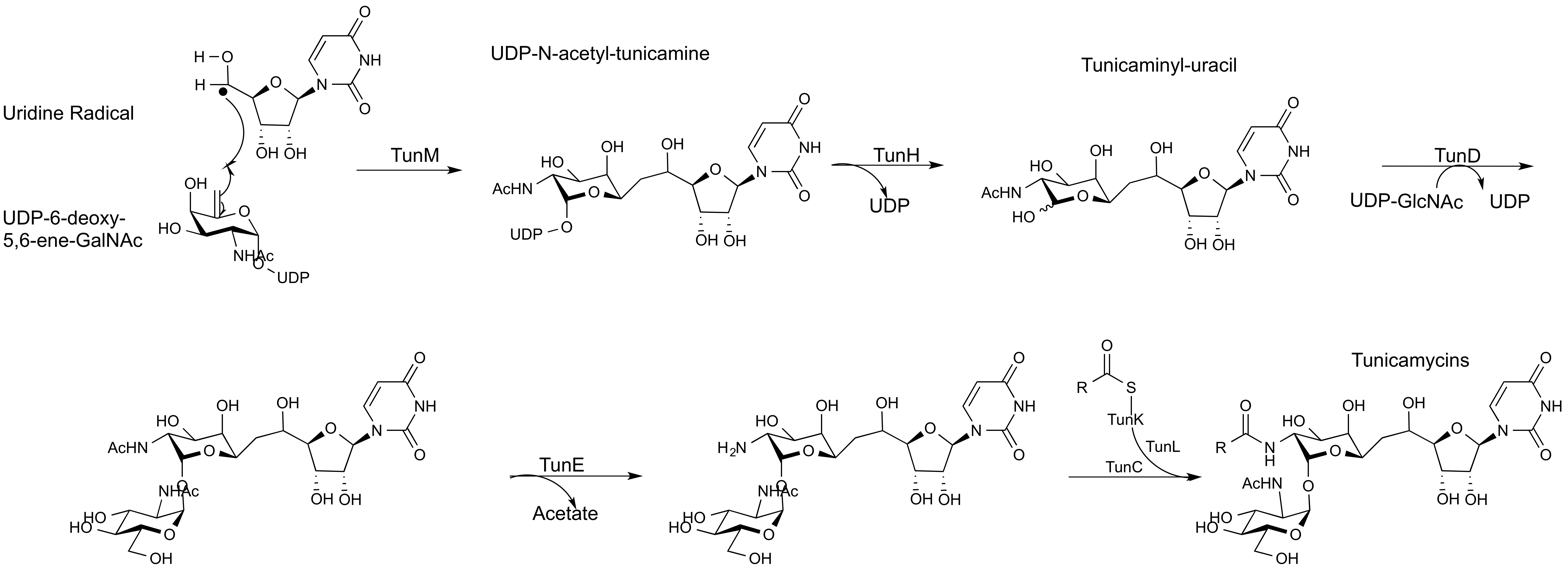

== See also ==
- Glycosylation - tunicamycin blocks all N-glycosylation of proteins
- Glycoprotein
- Streptomyces
