= Diphenylketene =

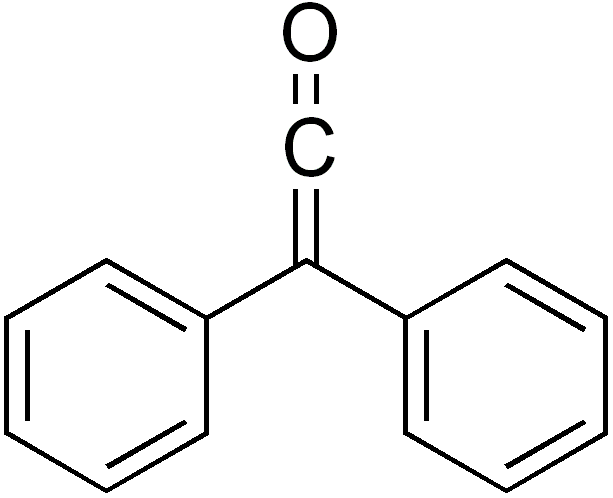

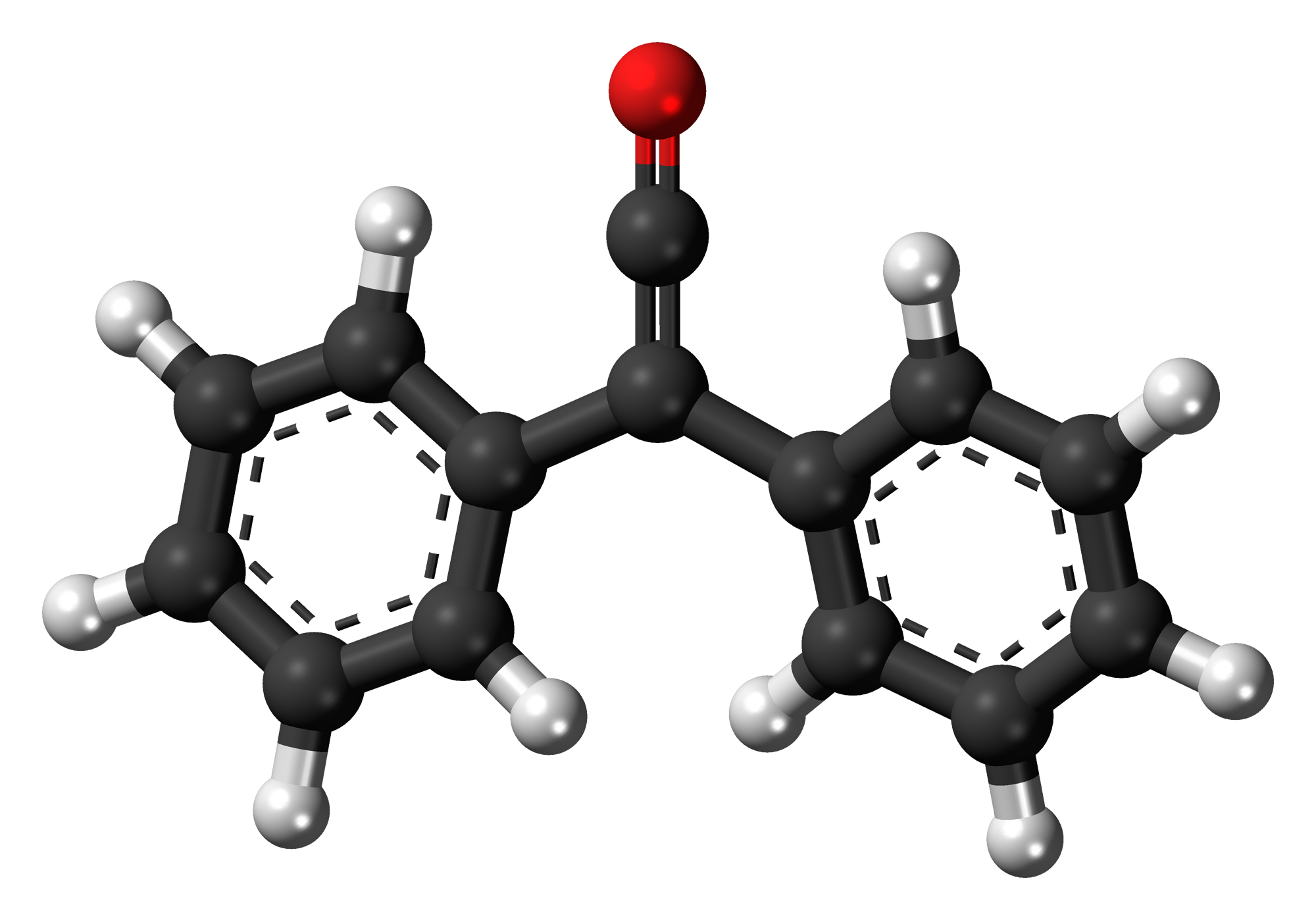

Names
- Preferred IUPAC name 2,2-Diphenylethen-1-one
- Other names Diphenylethenone

Identifiers
CAS Number	525-06-4
3D model (JSmol)	Interactive image; Interactive image
ChemSpider	109691
PubChem CID	123069
UNII	50BG2854L0
CompTox Dashboard (EPA)	DTXSID50200497
- InChI: InChI=1S/C14H10O/c15-11-14(12-7-3-1-4-8-12)13-9-5-2-6-10-13/h1-10H Key: ZWJPCOALBPMBIC-UHFFFAOYSA-N; InChI=1/C14H10O/c15-11-14(12-7-3-1-4-8-12)13-9-5-2-6-10-13/h1-10H Key: ZWJPCOALBPMBIC-UHFFFAOYAQ
- SMILES: C1=CC=C(C=C1)C(=C=O)C2=CC=CC=C2; O=C=C(c1ccccc1)c2ccccc2

Properties
Chemical formula	C_{14}H_{10}O
Molar mass	194.233 g·mol^{−1}
Appearance	Red-orange oil
Melting point	8 to 9 °C (46 to 48 °F; 281 to 282 K)
Boiling point	118 to 120 at 1mmHg
- Except where otherwise noted, data are given for materials in their standard state (at 25 °C [77 °F], 100 kPa). verify (what is ?) Infobox references

Diphenylketene is a chemical substance of the ketene family. Diphenylketene, like most stable disubstituted ketenes, is a red-orange oil at room temperature and pressure. Due to the successive double bonds in the ketene structure R^{1}R^{2}C=C=O, diphenyl ketene is a heterocumulene. The most important reaction of diphenyl ketene is the [2+2] cycloaddition at C-C, C-N, C-O, and C-S multiple bonds.

== History ==
Diphenyl ketene was first isolated by Hermann Staudinger in 1905 and identified as the first example of the exceptionally reactive class of ketenes with the general formula R^{1}R^{2}C=C=O (R^{1}=R^{2}=phenyl group).

== Preparation ==
The first synthesis by H. Staudinger was based on 2-chlorodiphenylacetyl chloride (prepared from benzilic acid and thionyl chloride) from which two chlorine atoms are cleaved with zinc in a dehalogenation reaction:

Synthesis of diphenylketene by Staudinger

An early synthesis uses benzilmonohydrazone (from Diphenylethanedione and hydrazine hydrate), which is oxidized with mercury(II)oxide and calcium sulfate to form mono-diazoketone, and is then converted into the diphenylketene at 100 °C under nitrogen elimination in 58% yield:

Synthesis of diphenylketene from benzilmonohydrazone

A further early diphenylketene synthesis originates from Eduard Wedekind, who had already obtained diphenyl ketene in 1901 by the dehydrohalogenation of diphenylacetyl chloride with triethylamine, without isolation and characterization though. This variant was also described in 1911 by H. Staudinger.

Synthesis of diphenylketene from diphenylacetate

A standard laboratory protocol is based on the Staudinger method and yields diphenyl ketene as an orange oil in yields of 53 to 57%. In a more recent process, 2-bromo-2,2-diphenylacetyl bromide is reacted with triphenylphosphine to give diphenyl ketene in yields up to 81%.

Synthesis of diphenylketene by debromination

Recently, a synthesis of diphenyl ketene from diphenylacetic acid and the Hendrickson reagent (triphenylphosphonium anhydride-trifluoromethanesulfonate) with water elimination in 72% yield has been reported.

Synthesis of diphenylketene using the Hendrickson reagent

== Properties ==
Diphenyl ketene is at room temperature an orange-colored to red oil (with the color of concentrated potassium dichromate solution) which is miscible with nonpolar organic solvents (such as diethyl ether, acetone, benzene, tetrahydrofuran, chloroform) and solidifies in the cold forming yellow crystals. The compound is easily oxidized by air but can be stored in tightly closed containers at 0 °C for several weeks without decomposition or in a nitrogen atmosphere with the addition of a small amount of hydroquinone as a polymerization inhibitor.

=== Reactivity ===
Diphenylketene can undergo attack from a host of nucleophiles, including alcohols, amines, and enolates with fairly slow rates. These rates can be increased in the presence of catalysts. At present the mechanism of attack is unknown, but work is underway to determine the exact mechanism.

The high reactivity of the diphenyl ketene is also evident in the formation of three dimers:

- the cyclic diketone 2,2,4,4-tetraphenylcyclobutane-1,3-dione (I) by heating with quinoline
- the β-lactone 4-(diphenylmethylene)-3,3-diphenyloxetan-2-one (II) by heating with sodium methoxide and
- the tetraline derivative 2,2,4-triphenylnaphthalene-1,3-(2H,4H)-dione (III) by heating with benzoyl chloride

Dimers of diphenylketene

and oligomers produced therefrom.

== Application ==
Ketenes (of the general formula R^{1}R^{2}C=C=O) have many parallels to isocyanates (of the general formula R-N=C=O) in their constitution as well as in their reactivity.

Diphenyl ketene reacts with water in an addition reaction to form diphenylacetic acid, with ethanol to diphenyl acetic ethyl ester or with ammonia to the corresponding amide. Carboxylic acids produce mixed anhydrides of diphenylacetic acid, which can be used to activate protected amino acids for peptide linkage.

Ph_{2}C=C=O + Z−Leu → Ph_{2}CO−O−CO−Z−Leu
Ph_{2}CO−O−CO−Z−Leu + H−Phe−OEt → Z−Leu−Phe−OEt

The protected dipeptide Z-Leu-Phe-OEt (N-benzyloxycarbonyl-L-leucyl-L-phenylalanine ethyl ester) is thus obtained in 59% yield via the activation of Z-leucine with diphenyl ketene and subsequent reaction with phenylalanine ethyl ester.

Diphenyl ketene is prone to autoxidation, in which the corresponding polyester is formed at temperatures above 60 °C via an intermediate diphenyl acetolactone.

Autoxidation and polymerisation of diphenylketene

In a Wittig reaction, allenes can be prepared from diphenyl ketene.

Formation of tetraphenylallene from diphenylketene

With triphenylphosphine diphenylmethylene and diphenyl ketene, at e. g. 140 °C and under pressure tetraphenyl allenes are formed in 70% yield.

The synthetically most interesting reactions of diphenyl ketene are [2+2]cycloadditions, e.g. the reaction with cyclopentadiene yielding a Diels-Alder adduct.

Addition of diphenylketen to cyclopentadiene

Imines such as benzalaniline form β-lactams with diphenyl ketene.

β-lactam formation from diphenylketene

With carbonyl compounds β-lactones are formed analogously.

The [2+2]cycloaddition of diphenyl ketene with phenylacetylene leads first to a cyclobutenone which thermally aromatizes to a phenyl vinyl ketene and cyclizes in a [4+2]cycloaddition to 3,4-diphenyl-1-naphthol in 81% yield.

Cycloaddition of diphenylketene to diphenylnaphthol

From this so-called Smith-Hoehn reaction a general synthesis method for substituted phenols and quinones has been developed.
