= Isopenicillin N synthase =

Class of enzymes

isopenicillin N synthase

Identifiers
- EC no.: 1.21.3.1
- CAS no.: 78642-31-6

Databases
- IntEnz: IntEnz view
- BRENDA: BRENDA entry
- ExPASy: NiceZyme view
- KEGG: KEGG entry
- MetaCyc: metabolic pathway
- PRIAM: profile
- PDB structures: RCSB PDB PDBe PDBsum
- Gene Ontology: AmiGO / QuickGO
Search
- PMC: articles
- PubMed: articles
- NCBI: proteins

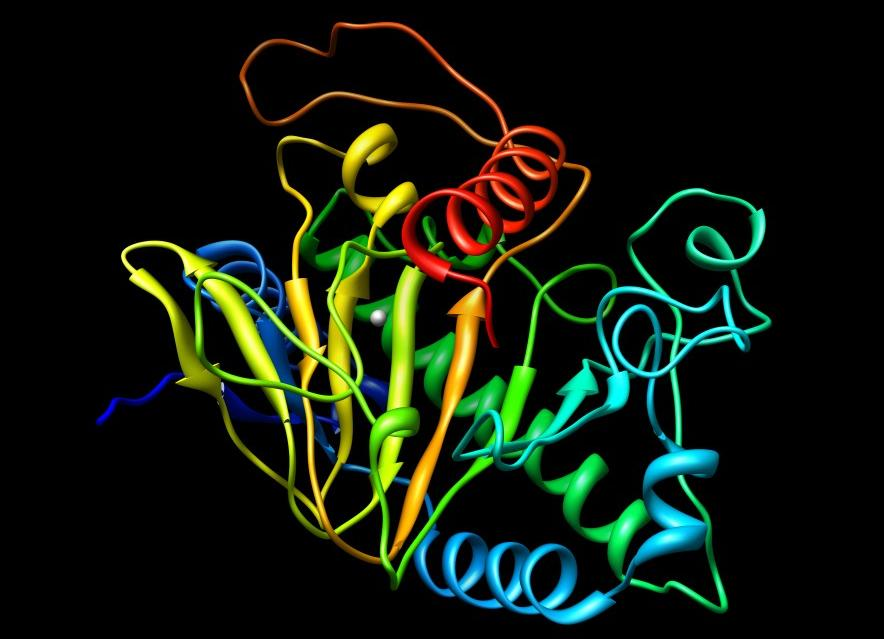
Ribbon diagram of isopenicillin N Synthase. Active site iron is visible at center in gray. From PDB 1BK0

Isopenicillin N synthase (IPNS) is a non-heme iron protein. This enzyme catalyzes the formation of isopenicillin N from δ-(L-α-aminoadipoyl)-L-cysteinyl-D-valine (LLD-ACV). IPNS occupies an early and key role in the biosynthetic pathway of all of the penicillins and cephalosporins, which are types of β-lactam antibiotics. This class of antibiotics is the most widely used. They act by inhibiting the synthesis of the peptidoglycan layer of bacterial cell walls, which is especially important in Gram-positive organisms.

N-[(5S)-5-amino-5-carboxypentanoyl]-L-cysteinyl-D-valine + O_{2} $\rightleftharpoons$ isopenicillin N + 2 H_{2}O

This reaction is a step in the biosynthesis of penicillin and cephalosporin antibiotics.

The active sites of most isopenicillin N synthases contain an iron ion. This enzyme is also called isopenicillin N synthetase.

== Mechanism ==
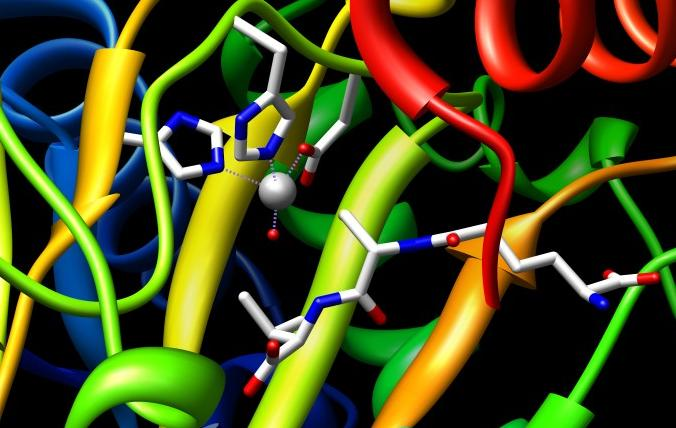
Close up rendering of active site of isopenicillin N synthase, showing His270, His214, Asp216 (top left to right, clockwise), and a water molecule coordinating the ferrous active site, while ACV (bottom right) binds. From PDB 1BK0

The active site features Fe(II) bound to at least two histidine residues, an aspartate residue, a glutamine residue, and two water molecules. The two histidine residues and one aspartic acid residue are conserved. Concomitant with deprotonation of the thiol, ACV binds the active site, displacing Gln330 and one water molecule.

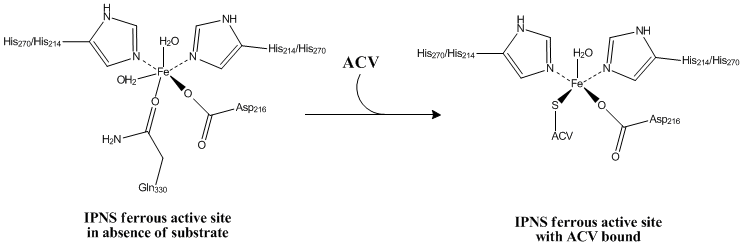

The linear tripeptide δ-(L-α-aminoadipoyl)-L-cysteinyl-D-valine (LLD-ACV) must first be assembled from its component amino acids by N-(5-amino-5-carboxypentanoyl)-L-cysteinyl-D-valine synthase (ACV synthase).

The ligation of ACV decreases the Fe(II)/Fe(III) redox potential, which is known in model systems. The electron-rich Fe(II) center binds dioxygen. An intramolecular hydrogen atom transfer from FeSCH_{2} to the Fe-O_{2} group converts the Fe(III) back to the Fe(II). The Fe(II)-OOH then deprotonates the amide, which then closes the β-lactam ring by a nucleophilic attack at the thioaldehyde carbon.This causes the hydrogen atom at the C-3 of the valine residue to come closer to the iron(IV) oxo ligand which is highly electrophilic. A second hydrogen transfer occurs, most likely producing an isopropyl radical which closes the thiazolidine ring by attacking the thiolate sulfur atom.

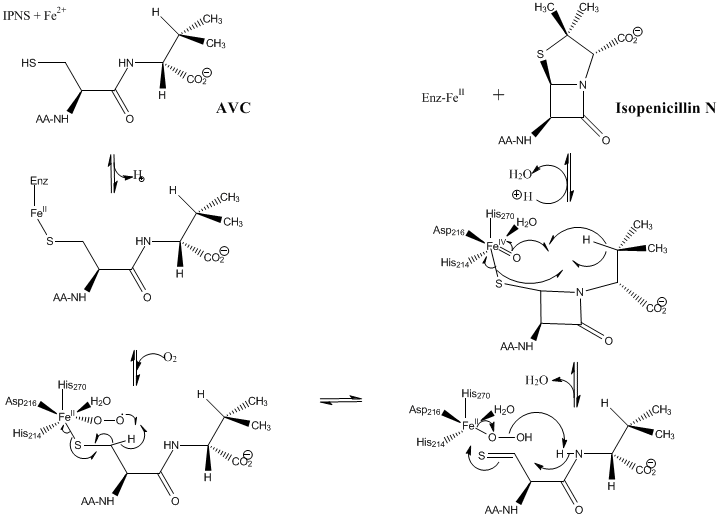

== Role in Antibiotic Formation ==
Pathway of penicillin and cephalosporin biosynthesis, illustrating the role of isopenicillin N synthase in the formation of beta-lactam antibiotics

Following the IPNS pathway, further enzymes are responsible for the epimerization of isopenicillin N to penicillin N, the derivitazation to other penicillins, and the ring expansion that eventually leads to the various cephalosporins.

== Structural studies ==
Many structures have been solved for this class of enzymes, with PDB accession codes 1ODM, 1UZW, 1W03, 1W04, 1W05, 1W06, 1W3V, 1W3X, 2BJS, 2BU9, 2IVI, 2IVJ, 2JB4, 1QJE, 1ODN, 1HB1, 1HB2, 1HB3, 1HB4, 1QIQ, 1QJF, 1BK0, 1BLZ, 1OBN, 1OC1, 1IPS
