= Clavulanic acid =

Molecule used to overcome antibiotic resistance in bacteria

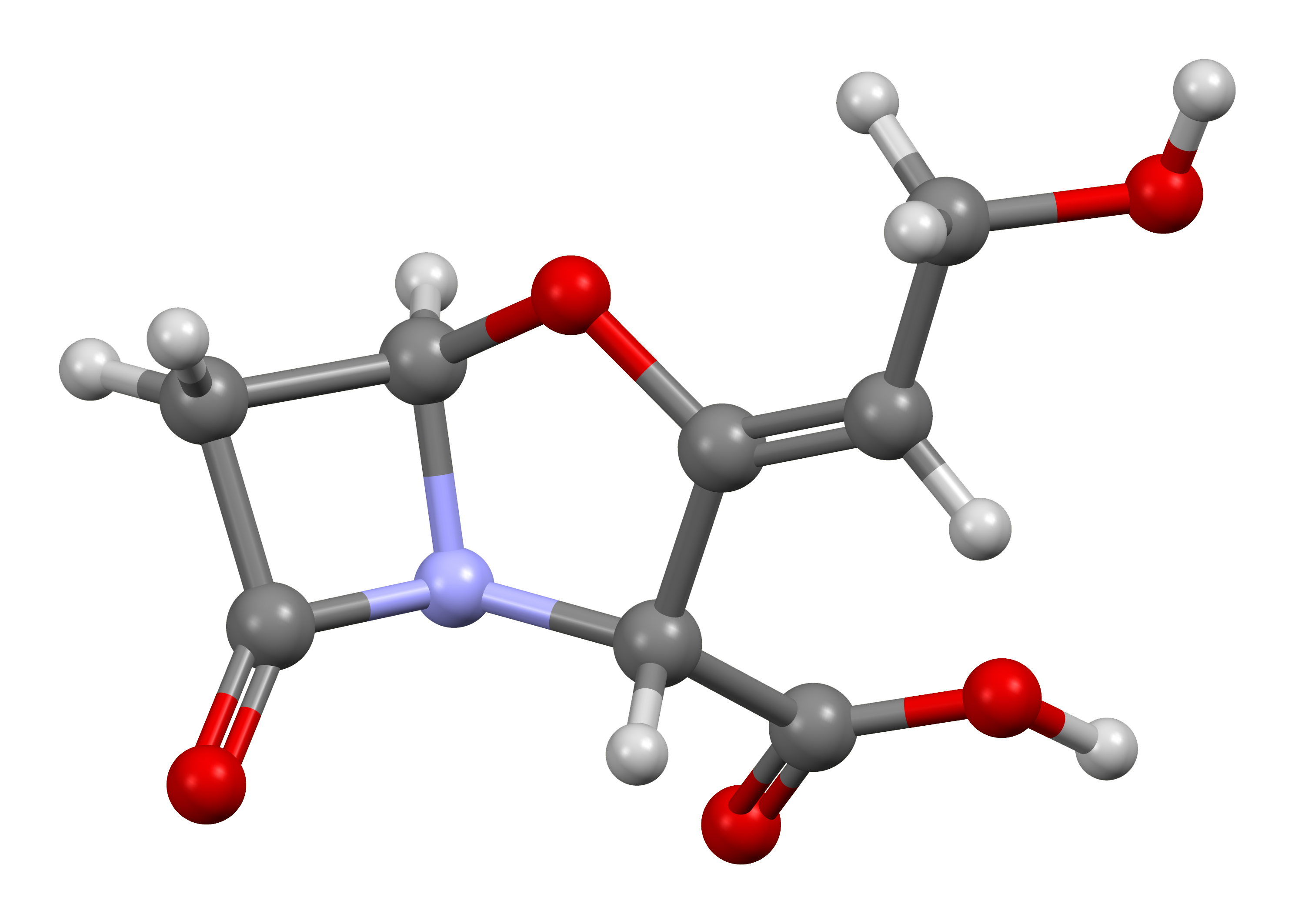

Clinical data
- Pronunciation: /ˌklævjʊˈlænɪk/
- Other names: RX-10100; Serdaxin; Zoraxel
- AHFS/Drugs.com: International Drug Names
- License data: US DailyMed: Clavulanic acid
- Pregnancy category: AU: B1
- Routes of administration: By mouth, intravenous
- ATC code: J01CR (WHO) (combinations with penicillins)

Legal status
- Legal status: AU: S4 (Prescription only); In general: ℞ (Prescription only)

Pharmacokinetic data
- Bioavailability: Oral: 45–64%
- Protein binding: ~25%
- Metabolism: Unknown
- Metabolites: Two minor metabolites
- Onset of action: ≤0.67–2 hours (T_{max})
- Elimination half-life: 0.8–1.2 hours
- Excretion: Urine: 35–65% (unchanged; within 6 hours)

Identifiers
- IUPAC name: (2R,5R,Z)-3-(2-Hydroxyethylidene)-7-oxo-4-oxa-1-aza-bicyclo[3.2.0]heptane-2-carboxylic acid
- CAS Number: 58001-44-8
- PubChem CID: 5280980
- DrugBank: DB00766
- ChemSpider: 4444466
- UNII: 23521W1S24
- KEGG: D07711
- ChEBI: CHEBI:48947
- ChEMBL: ChEMBL777
- CompTox Dashboard (EPA): DTXSID2022830
- ECHA InfoCard: 100.055.500

Chemical and physical data
- Formula: C_{8}H_{9}NO_{5}
- Molar mass: 199.162 g·mol^{−1}
- 3D model (JSmol): Interactive image
- SMILES: O=C2N1[C@H](C(/O[C@@H]1C2)=C/CO)C(=O)O
- InChI: InChI=1S/C8H9NO5/c10-2-1-4-7(8(12)13)9-5(11)3-6(9)14-4/h1,6-7,10H,2-3H2,(H,12,13)/b4-1-/t6-,7-/m1/s1; Key:HZZVJAQRINQKSD-PBFISZAISA-N

Clavulanic acid is a β-lactam drug that functions as a mechanism-based β-lactamase inhibitor. While not effective by itself as an antibiotic, when combined with penicillin-group antibiotics, it can overcome antibiotic resistance in bacteria that secrete β-lactamase, which otherwise inactivates most penicillins.

In its most common preparations, potassium clavulanate (clavulanic acid as a salt of potassium) is combined with:

- amoxicillin (co-amoxiclav, trade names Augmentin, Clavulin, Tyclav, Clavaseptin (veterinary), Clavamox (veterinary), Synulox (veterinary), and others)
- ticarcillin (co-ticarclav, trade name Timentin)

Clavulanic acid was patented in 1974. In addition to its β-lactamase inhibition, clavulanic acid shows off-target activity in the nervous system by upregulating the glutamate transporter 1 (GLT-1) and has been studied in the potential treatment of a variety of central nervous system disorders.

== Medical uses ==
Amoxicillin–clavulanic acid is a first-line treatment for many types of infections, including sinus infections, and urinary tract infections, including pyelonephritis. This is, in part, because of its efficacy against gram-negative bacteria which tend to be more difficult to control than gram-positive bacteria with chemotherapeutic antibiotics.

== Adverse effects ==
The use of clavulanic acid with penicillins has been associated with an increased incidence of cholestatic jaundice and acute hepatitis during therapy or shortly after. The associated jaundice is usually self-limiting and very rarely fatal.

The UK Committee on Safety of Medicines (CSM) recommends that treatments such as amoxicillin/clavulanic acid preparations be reserved for bacterial infections likely to be caused by amoxicillin-resistant β-lactamase-producing strains, and that treatment should not normally exceed 14 days.

Allergic reactions have been reported.

== Sources ==
The name is derived from strains of Streptomyces clavuligerus, which produces clavulanic acid.

=== Biosynthesis ===
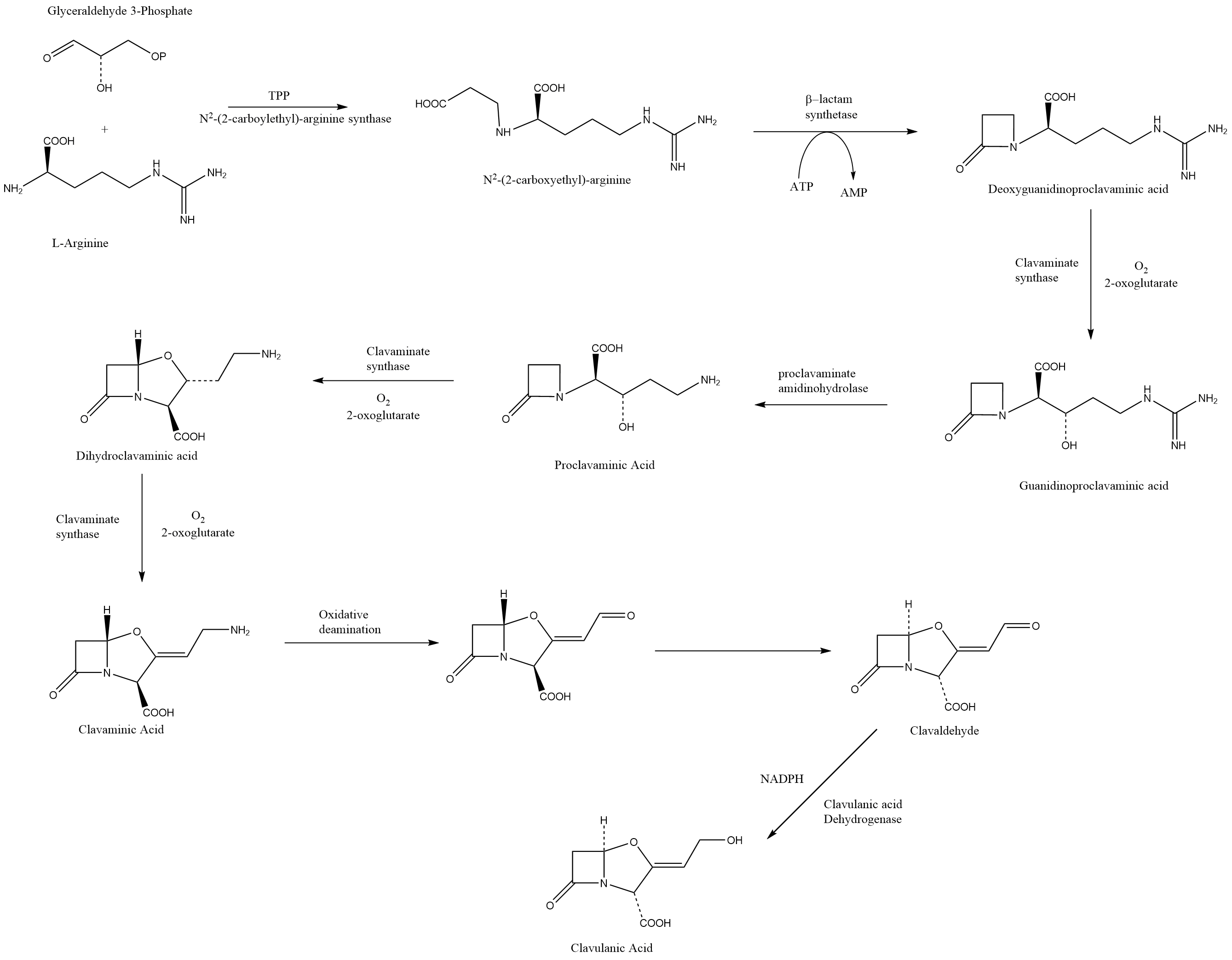
The intermediates of the biosynthesis of clavulanic acid

The β-lactam like structure of clavulanic acid looks structurally similar to penicillin, but the biosynthesis of this molecule involves a different biochemical pathway. Clavulanic acid is produced by the bacterium Streptomyces clavuligerus, using glyceraldehyde-3-phosphate and L-arginine as starting materials. Although each of the intermediates of the pathway is known, the exact mechanism for all of the enzymatic reactions is not fully understood. The process mainly involves 3 enzymes: clavaminate synthase, β-lactam synthetase, and N^{2}-(2-carboxyethyl)-L-arginine (CEA) synthase. Clavaminate synthase is a non-heme oxygenase dependent on iron and α-keto-glutarate and is encoded by orf5 of the clavulanic acid gene cluster. The specific mechanism of how this enzyme works is not fully understood, but this enzyme regulates 3 steps in the overall synthesis of clavulanic acid. All 3 steps occur in the same region of the catalytic, iron-containing reaction center, yet do not occur in sequence and affect different areas of the clavulanic acid structure.

β-lactam synthetase is a 54.5 kDa protein that is encoded by orf3 of the clavulanic acid gene cluster, and shows similarity to asparagine synthase – Class B enzymes. The exact mechanism on how this enzyme works to synthesize the β-lactam is not proven, but is believed to occur in coordination with a CEA synthase and ATP.

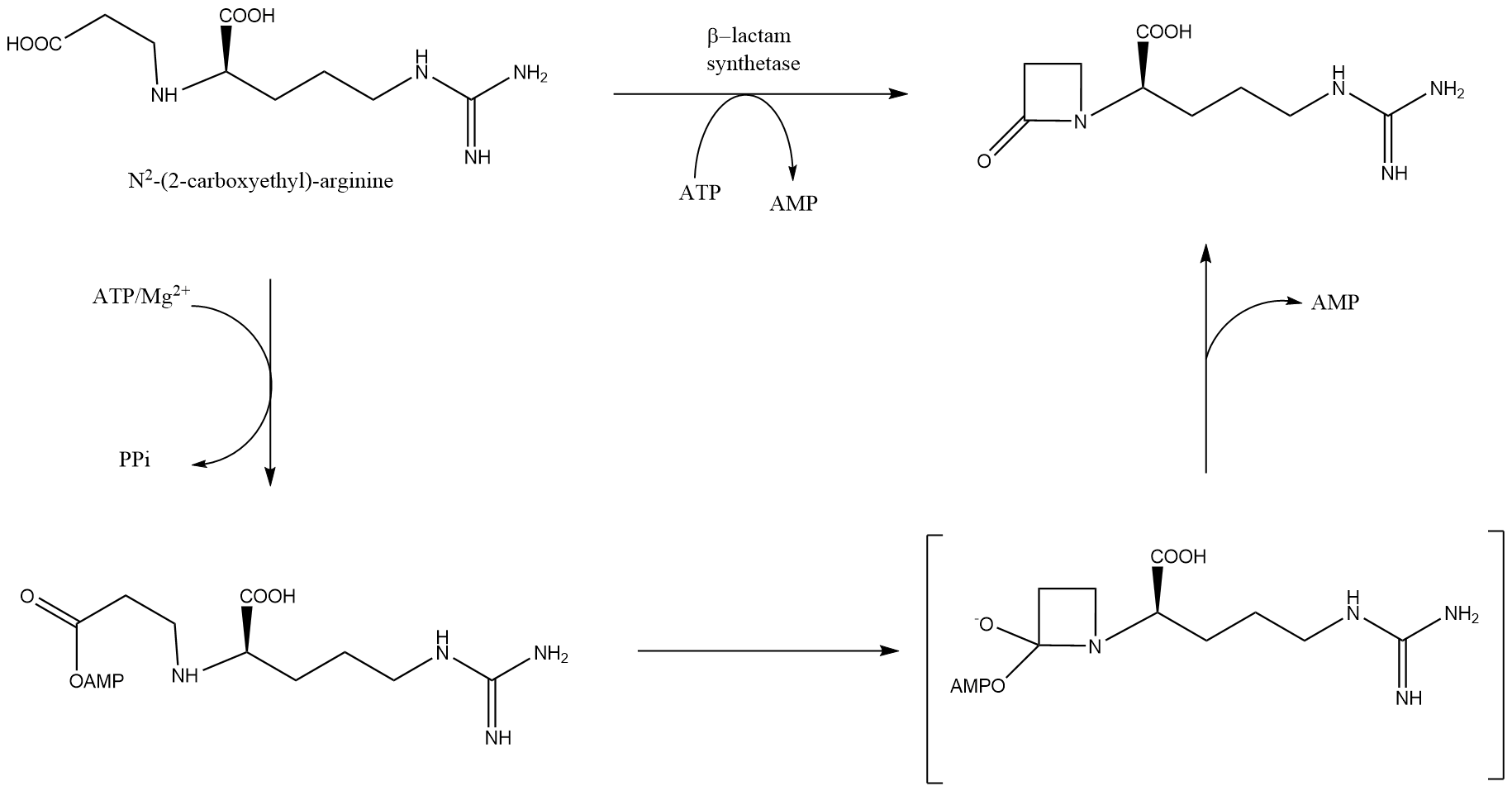
Proposed mechanism of beta-lactam synthetase in the biosynthesis of clavulanic acid.

CEA synthase is a 60.9 kDA protein and is the first gene found in the clavulanic acid biosynthesis gene cluster, encoded by orf2 of the clavulanic acid gene cluster. The specific mechanism of how this enzyme works is still under investigation; however, it is known that this enzyme has the ability to couple together glyceraldehyde-3-phosphate with L-arginine in the presence of thiamine diphosphate (TDP or thiamine pyrophosphate), which is the first step of the clavulanic acid biosynthesis.

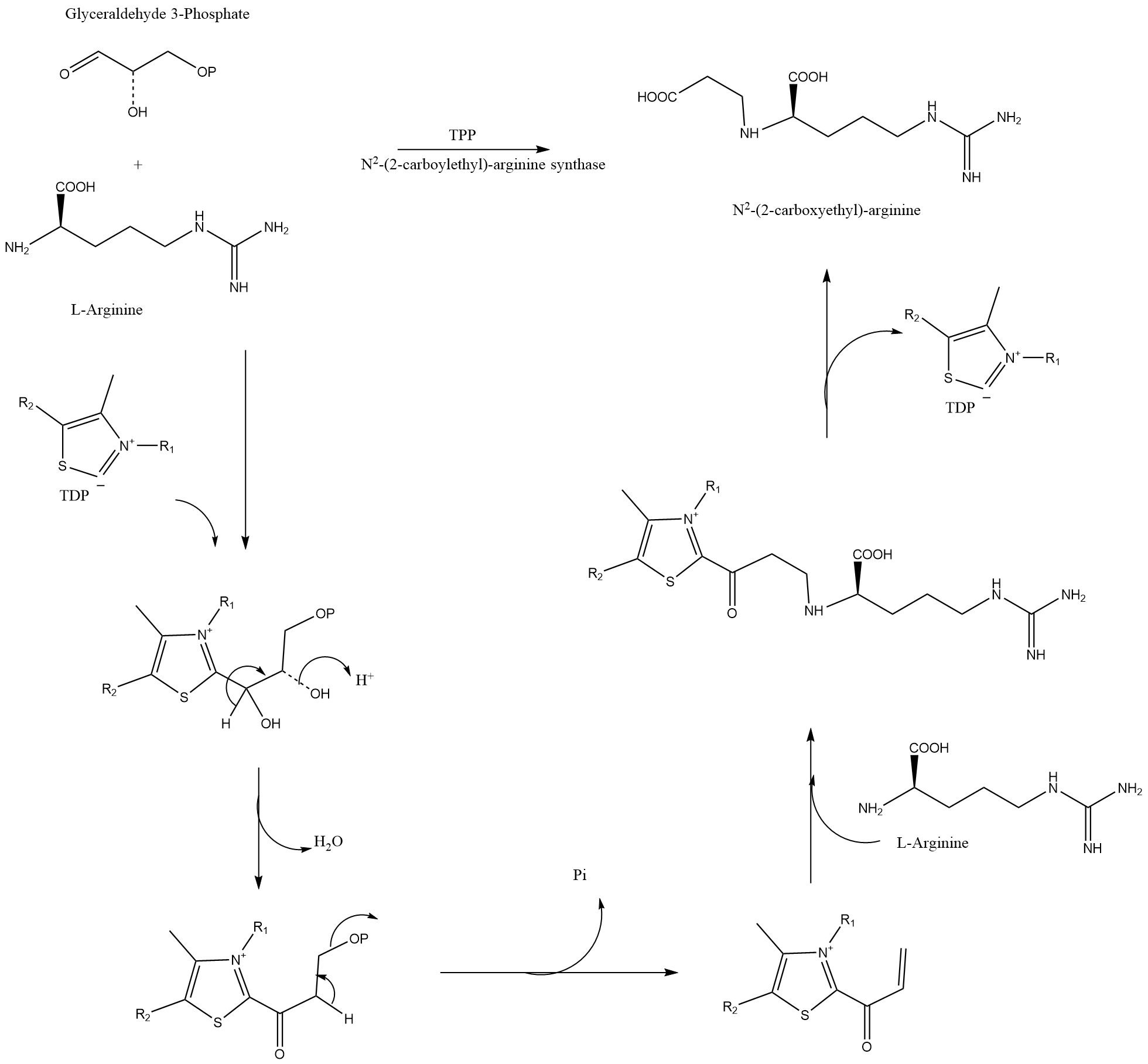
Proposed mechanism of CEA synthetase in the biosynthesis of clavulanic acid.

== History ==
Clavulanic acid was discovered around 1974-75 by British scientists working at the drug company Beecham from the bacteria Streptomyces clavuligerus. After several attempts, Beecham finally filed for US patent protection for the drug in 1981, and U.S. Patents 4,525,352, 4,529,720, and 4,560,552 were granted in 1985.

== Mechanism of action ==
Clavulanic acid has negligible intrinsic antimicrobial activity, despite sharing the β-lactam ring that is characteristic of β-lactam antibiotics. However, the similarity in chemical structure allows the molecule to interact with the enzyme β-lactamase secreted by certain bacteria to confer resistance to β-lactam antibiotics.

Clavulanic acid is a suicide inhibitor, covalently bonding to a serine residue in the active site of the β-lactamase. This restructures the clavulanic acid molecule, creating a much more reactive species that attacks another amino acid in the active site, permanently inactivating it, and thus inactivating the enzyme.

This inhibition restores the antimicrobial activity of β-lactam antibiotics against lactamase-secreting resistant bacteria. Despite this, some bacterial strains that are resistant even to such combinations have emerged.

== Research ==
=== Neuromodulation ===
In 2005, it was discovered via screening of 1,040 Food and Drug Administration (FDA)-approved drugs and neutraceuticals that many β-lactams, such as ceftriaxone, upregulate astrocytic glutamate transporter 1 (GLT-1) expression. Subsequently, it was discovered that clavulanic acid, likewise a β-lactam, shares this action. The associated effects include enhanced GLT-1 expression in the nucleus accumbens, medial prefrontal cortex, and spinal cord, modulation of glutamatergic, dopaminergic, and serotonergic neurotransmission, and anti-inflammatory effects via modulation of cytokines tumor necrosis factor α (TNF-α) and interleukin-10 (IL-10). Ceftriaxone lacks oral bioavailability, has poor brain permeability, and has concomitant antibiotic activity. These limitations have resulted in more interest in clavulanic acid, which does not share these drawbacks and is more potent than ceftriaxone in vivo. The mechanism of action underlying the upregulation of GLT-1 expression by β-lactams is unknown. However, interactions with the SNARE proteins Munc18-1 and Rab4 may be involved in some of clavulanic acid's effects, such as increased dopamine release.

In relation to its central nervous system actions, clavulanic acid has been studied preclinically in models of anxiety, sexual behavior, addiction, neuropathic pain, inflammatory pain, epilepsy, Parkinson's disease, dementia, and stroke. In animals, including in rodents and/or monkeys, clavulanic acid has shown anxiolytic-like, antidepressant-like, pro-sexual, memory-enhancing, analgesic, antiaddictive, pro-dopaminergic, pro-oxytocinergic, and neuroprotective effects. The drug has been studied clinically in humans in the treatment of erectile dysfunction, depression, substance dependence, and pain, with positive or mixed preliminary results for these conditions reported.

Clavulanic acid was under formal development by Revaax Pharmaceuticals (now Ocuphire Pharma) for the treatment of erectile dysfunction, anxiety disorders, major depressive disorder, neurodegenerative disorders, and Parkinson's disease. However, development for these indications was discontinued by 2014. The developmental code name of clavulanic acid was RX-10100 and its tentative brand names were Serdaxin and Zoraxel. Although its development was discontinued, interest in clavulanic acid for potential nervous system-related uses has continued as of 2024.
