= N2-(2-carboxyethyl)arginine synthase =

Enzyme

Identifiers
- EC no.: 2.5.1.66

Databases
- IntEnz: IntEnz view
- BRENDA: BRENDA entry
- ExPASy: NiceZyme view
- KEGG: KEGG entry
- MetaCyc: metabolic pathway
- PRIAM: profile
- PDB structures: RCSB PDB PDBe PDBsum
Search
- PMC: articles
- PubMed: articles
- NCBI: proteins

In enzymology, a N2-(2-carboxyethyl)arginine synthase (EC 2.5.1.66) is an enzyme that catalyzes the chemical reaction

D-glyceraldehyde 3-phosphate + L-arginine $\rightleftharpoons$ N_{2}-(2-carboxyethyl)-L-arginine + phosphate

Thus, the two substrates of this enzyme are D-glyceraldehyde 3-phosphate and L-arginine, whereas its two products are N2-(2-carboxyethyl)-L-arginine and phosphate.

This enzyme belongs to the family of transferases, specifically those transferring aryl or alkyl groups other than methyl groups. The systematic name of this enzyme class is glyceraldehyde-3-phosphate:L-arginine N2-(2-hydroxy-3-oxopropyl) transferase (2-carboxyethyl-forming). Other names in common use include CEAS, N2-(2-carboxyethyl)arginine synthetase, CEA synthetase, glyceraldehyde-3-phosphate:L-arginine 2-N-(2-hydroxy-3-oxopropyl), and transferase (2-carboxyethyl-forming). This enzyme participates in clavulanic acid biosynthesis.

== Structural studies ==
As of late 2007, two structures have been solved for this class of enzymes, with PDB accession codes 2IHT and 2IHV.
