= Latamoxef =

Chemical compound

Clinical data
- AHFS/Drugs.com: International Drug Names
- Routes of administration: Intramuscular, intravenous
- ATC code: J01DD06 (WHO)

Pharmacokinetic data
- Protein binding: 35 to 50%
- Metabolism: Nil
- Elimination half-life: 2 hours
- Excretion: Mostly renal, unchanged; also biliary

Identifiers
- IUPAC name: (6R,7R)-7-{[carboxy(4-hydroxyphenyl)acetyl]amino}-7-methoxy-3-{[(1-methyl-1H-tetrazol-5-yl)thio]methyl}-8-oxo-5-oxa-1-azabicyclo[4.2.0]oct-2-ene-2-carboxylic acid
- CAS Number: 64952-97-2
- PubChem CID: 47499
- DrugBank: DB04570
- ChemSpider: 43215
- UNII: VUF6C936Z3
- KEGG: D08109
- ChEBI: CHEBI:599928
- ChEMBL: ChEMBL74632
- CompTox Dashboard (EPA): DTXSID9023338
- ECHA InfoCard: 100.059.334

Chemical and physical data
- Formula: C_{20}H_{20}N_{6}O_{9}S
- Molar mass: 520.47 g·mol^{−1}
- 3D model (JSmol): Interactive image
- Melting point: 117 to 122 °C (243 to 252 °F) (dec.)
- SMILES: O=C2N1/C(=C(\CO[C@@H]1[C@]2(OC)NC(=O)C(c3ccc(O)cc3)C(=O)O)CSc4nnnn4C)C(=O)O
- InChI: InChI=1S/C20H20N6O9S/c1-25-19(22-23-24-25)36-8-10-7-35-18-20(34-2,17(33)26(18)13(10)16(31)32)21-14(28)12(15(29)30)9-3-5-11(27)6-4-9/h3-6,12,18,27H,7-8H2,1-2H3,(H,21,28)(H,29,30)(H,31,32)/t12?,18-,20+/m1/s1; Key:JWCSIUVGFCSJCK-CAVRMKNVSA-N

Latamoxef (or moxalactam) is an oxacephem antibiotic usually grouped with the cephalosporins. In oxacephems such as latamoxef, the sulfur atom of the cephalosporin core is replaced with an oxygen atom.

Latamoxef has been associated with prolonged bleeding time, and several cases of coagulopathy, some fatal, were reported during the 1980s. Latamoxef is no longer available in the United States. As with other cephalosporins with a methylthiotetrazole side chain, latamoxef causes a disulfiram reaction when mixed with alcohol. Additionally, the methylthiotetrazole side chain inhibits γ-carboxylation of glutamic acid; this can interfere with the actions of vitamin K.

It has been described as a third-generation cephalosporin.

== Synthesis ==
Oxa-substituted third generation cephalosporin antibiotic (oxacephalosporin).

Moxalactam synthesis: (excerpt from Lednicer book 3)

The benzhydrol ester of 6-Aminopenicillanic acid (6-APA) is S-chlorinated and treated with base whereupon the intermediate sulfenyl chloride fragments (to 2). Next, displacement with propargyl alcohol in the presence of zinc chloride gives predominantly the stereochemistry represented by diastereoisomer 3. The side chain is protected as the phenylacetylamide; the triple bond is partially reduced with a 5% Pd-CaCO_{3} (Lindlar catalyst) and then epoxidized with mCPBA to give 4. The epoxide is opened at the least hindered end with 1-methyl-1H-tetrazole-5-thiol to put in place the future C-3 side chain and give intermediate 5. Jones oxidation followed in turn by ozonolysis (reductive work-up with zinc-AcOH) and reaction with SOCl_{2} and pyridine give halide 6. The stage is now wet for intramolecular Wittig reaction. Displacement with PPh3 and Wittig olefination gives 1-oxacephem 7. Next a sequence is undertaken of side chain exchange and introduction of a 7-methoxyl group analogous to that which is present in cephamycins and gives them the enhanced beta-lactamase stability. First 7 is converted to the imino chloride with PCl5 and then to the imino methyl ether (with methanol) and next hydrolyzed to the free amine (8). Imine formation with 3,5-di-t-butyl-4-hydroxybenzaldehyde is next carried out leading to 9. Oxidation with nickel(III) oxide gives iminoquinone methide 10, to which methanol is added in a conjugate sense and in the stereochemistry represented by formula 11. The imine is exchanged with Girard's reagent T to give 12, and this is acylated by a suitable protected arylmalonate, as the hemiester hemiacid chloride so as to give 11. Deblocking with aluminium chloride and anisole gives moxalactam 14.
