= Streptomyces clavuligerus =

Scientific classification
- Domain: Bacteria
- Kingdom: Bacillati
- Phylum: Actinomycetota
- Class: Actinomycetes
- Order: Streptomycetales
- Family: Streptomycetaceae
- Genus: Streptomyces
- Species: S. clavuligerus

Binomial name
- Streptomyces clavuligerus Higgens & Kastner 1971

Species of Gram-positive bacterium

Streptomyces clavuligerus is a species of Gram-positive bacterium notable for producing clavulanic acid.

S. clavuligerus ATCC 27064 (NRRL 3585, DSM 738) was first described by Higgens and Kastner (1971), who isolated it from a South American soil sample. Its name refers to the shape of its spore-bearing hyphal branches: from the Latin clavula 'little club' and igerus 'bearing'. S. clavuligerus spores are gray to grayish-green.

S. clavuligerus produces over 20 secondary metabolites, including many beta-lactam antibiotics such as clavulanic acid, cephamycin C, deacetoxycephalosporin C, penicillin N (an intermediate in cephamycin C pathway), and at least four other clavams. Non-β-lactam antibiotics include holomycin and an antibiotic complex, MM 19290, related to tunicamycin; a beta-lactamase-inhibitory protein (BLIP) has also been described. For S. clavuligerus ATCC 27064, a teleocidin biosynthetic gene cluster was identified in early isolates held at ATCC, apparently missing from later isolates used for industrial production of clavulanic acid.

Another important characteristic of S. clavuligerus is that it is not able to use glucose as a carbon source because it lacks a glucose transport system.

It also possesses all the enzymes of the urea cycle, which is unusual for a prokaryote, although it is not clear whether the urea cycle is functional.
