= ACV synthetase =

Class of enzymes

N-(5-Amino-5-carboxypentanoyl)-L-cysteinyl-D-valine synthase

Identifiers
- EC no.: 6.3.2.26
- CAS no.: 57219-73-5

Databases
- BRENDA: enzyme data
- ExPASy: NiceZyme view
- KEGG: enzyme entry
- MetaCyc: metabolic pathway
- Rhea: reactions
- PDB structures: RCSB PDB PDBe PDBsum
- Gene Ontology: AmiGO / QuickGO
Search
- PMC: articles
- PubMed: articles
- NCBI: proteins

ACV synthetase (ACVS, L-δ-(α-aminoadipoyl)-L-cysteinyl-D-valine synthetase, N-(5-amino-5-carboxypentanoyl)-L-cysteinyl-D-valine synthase, EC 6.3.2.26) is an enzyme that catalyzes the chemical reaction

3 ATP + L-2-aminohexanedioate + L-cysteine + L-valine $\rightleftharpoons$ 3 AMP + 3 PP_{i} + 2 H_{2}O + N-[L-5-amino-5-carboxypentanoyl]-L-cysteinyl-D-valine

The five substrates of this enzyme are ATP, L-2-aminohexanedioate, L-cysteine, L-valine, and H_{2}O, whereas its three products are AMP, diphosphate, and N-[L-5-amino-5-carboxypentanoyl]-L-cysteinyl-D-valine.

ACVS is an example of a nonribosomal peptide synthetase (NRPS). It participates in penicillin and cephalosporin biosyntheses.
