= Β-Lactam =

Family of chemical compounds

2-Azetidinone, the simplest β-lactam

A β-lactam (beta-lactam) ring is a four-membered lactam. A lactam is a cyclic amide, and beta-lactams are named so because the nitrogen atom is attached to the β-carbon atom relative to the carbonyl. The simplest β-lactam possible is 2-azetidinone. β-lactams are significant structural units of medicines as manifested in many β-lactam antibiotics. Up to 1970, most β-lactam research was concerned with the penicillin and cephalosporin groups, but since then, a wide variety of structures have been described.

== Clinical significance ==
Core structures of some medicinally important beta-lactams. From left to right: penam, penem, carbapenem, cepham, and cephem.

Penicillin core structure

The β-lactam ring is part of the core structure of several antibiotic families, the principal ones being the penicillins, cephalosporins, carbapenems, and monobactams, which are, therefore, also called β-lactam antibiotics. Nearly all of these antibiotics work by inhibiting bacterial cell wall biosynthesis. This has a lethal effect on bacteria, although any given bacteria population will typically contain a subgroup that is resistant to β-lactam antibiotics. Bacterial resistance occurs as a result of the expression of one of many genes for the production of β-lactamases, a class of enzymes that break open the β-lactam ring. More than 1,800 different β-lactamase enzymes have been documented in various species of bacteria. These enzymes vary widely in their chemical structure and catalytic efficiencies. When bacterial populations have these resistant subgroups, treatment with β-lactam can result in the resistant strain becoming more prevalent and therefore more virulent. β-lactam derived antibiotics can be considered one of the most important antibiotic classes but prone to clinical resistance. β-lactam exhibits its antibiotic properties by imitating the naturally occurring d-Ala-d-Ala substrate for the group of enzymes known as penicillin binding proteins (PBP), which have as function to cross-link the peptidoglycan part of the cell wall of the bacteria.

The β-lactam ring is also found in some other drugs such as the cholesterol absorption inhibitor drug ezetimibe.

== Synthesis ==
The first synthetic β-lactam was prepared by Hermann Staudinger in 1907 by reaction of the Schiff base of aniline and benzaldehyde with diphenylketene in a [2+2] cycloaddition (Ph indicates a phenyl functional group):

Many methods have been developed for the synthesis of β-lactams.

The Breckpot β-lactam synthesis produces substituted β-lactams by the cyclization of beta amino acid esters by use of a Grignard reagent. Mukaiyama's reagent is also used in modified Breckpot synthesis.

== Reactions ==
Due to ring strain, β-lactams are more readily hydrolyzed than linear amides or larger lactams. This strain is further increased by fusion to a second ring, as found in most β-lactam antibiotics. This trend is due to the amide character of the β-lactam being reduced by the aplanarity of the system. The nitrogen atom of an ideal amide is sp^{2}-hybridized due to resonance, and sp^{2}-hybridized atoms have trigonal planar bond geometry. As a pyramidal bond geometry is forced upon the nitrogen atom by the ring strain, the resonance of the amide bond is reduced, and the carbonyl becomes more ketone-like. Nobel laureate Robert Burns Woodward described a parameter h as a measure of the height of the trigonal pyramid defined by the nitrogen (as the apex) and its three adjacent atoms. h corresponds to the strength of the β-lactam bond with lower numbers (more planar; more like ideal amides) being stronger and less reactive. Monobactams have h values between 0.05 and 0.10 angstroms (Å). Cephems have h values in of 0.20–0.25 Å. Penams have values in the range 0.40–0.50 Å, while carbapenems and clavams have values of 0.50–0.60 Å, being the most reactive of the β-lactams toward hydrolysis.

== See also ==
- Azetidine
- Lactone
