= Penam =

Names
- IUPAC name (5R)-4-thia-1-azabicyclo[3.2.0]heptan-7-one
- Other names 1-Aza-7-oxo-4-thiabicyclo[3.2.0]heptane

Identifiers
CAS Number	53908-04-6
3D model (JSmol)	Interactive image
Beilstein Reference	4374479
ChEBI	CHEBI:35991
ChemSpider	7827765
PubChem CID	9548842
- InChI: InChI=1S/C5H7NOS/c7-4-3-5-6(4)1-2-8-5/h5H,1-3H2/t5-/m1/s1 Key: WSHJJCPTKWSMRR-RXMQYKEDSA-N; InChI=1S/C5H7NOS/c7-4-3-5-6(4)1-2-8-5/h5H,1-3H2/t5-/m1/s1 Key: WSHJJCPTKWSMRR-RXMQYKEDSA-N
- SMILES: C1CSC2N1C(=O)C2

Properties
Chemical formula	C_{5}H_{7}NOS
Molar mass	129.18 g·mol^{−1}

Related compounds
Related compounds	clavam
- Except where otherwise noted, data are given for materials in their standard state (at 25 °C [77 °F], 100 kPa). Infobox references

Benzylpenicillin, an example of a penam

Penams are bicyclic ring systems containing a β-lactam moiety fused with a five-member thiazolidine ring. The parent penem, which is only of pedagogical interest, has the formula CHSCHCH_{2}CH_{2}NC(O)CH_{2}. Substituted derivatives are of great interest because they include the penicillins. Due to ring strain and limitations on amide resonance, the structure is susceptible to catalytic cleavage at the amide bond. Benzylpenicillin (penicillin G) is a naturally occurring penam.

The IUPAC Nomenclature of Organic Chemistry lists penam among parent structures of natural compounds, being the single enantiomer (R).

== Structure ==
Penams are relatively inflexible. The structure is locked in a puckered (i.e. bent) shape. The bridgehead nitrogen is somewhat pyramidal (χ = 54°), in contrast to acyclic amides. The C-N bond (τ = 18°) is twisted. The amide C-N bond length is 1.406 Å and displays greater single bond character than in noncyclic tertiary amides. The C-O bond length is 1.205 Å which is shorter than C-O bonds in noncyclic tertiary amides. Consequently, penams are susceptible to acid- and base-catalyzed hydrolysis.
