= SEPTIN2 =

Protein-coding gene in the species Homo sapiens

An Error has occurred retrieving Wikidata item for infobox Septin-2 (also known as SEPT2) is a protein which in humans is encoded by the SEPTIN2 gene (previously SEPT2).

== Function ==
SEPT2 can hetero-oligomerize with SEPT6 and SEPT7 to form filaments. SEPT2 interacted with SEPT6 through its C-terminal coiled-coil domain. Knockdown of SEPT2, SEPT6, and SEPT7 in causes actin stress fibers to disintegrate and cells to lose polarity. Septins, SOCS7, and NCK1 are part of a signaling pathway that ties regulation of the DNA damage response to the cytoskeleton.

== Interactions ==
SEPT2 has been shown to interact with:

- SEPT6
- SEPT7, and
- SEPT9.
