= RevCen =

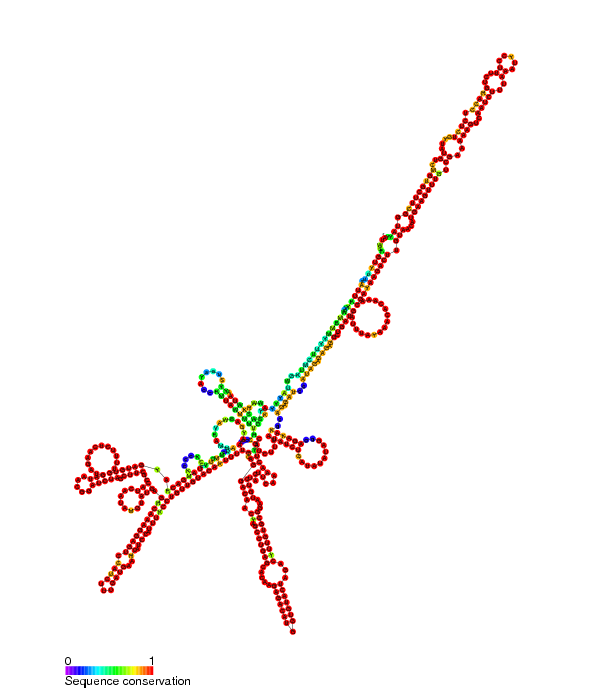
- Conserved secondary structure of RevCen RNA.

Identifiers
- Symbol: RevCen

Other data
- RNA type: Gene; pre-miRNA
- Domain: Schizosaccharomyces
- PDB structures: PDBe

RevCen is a family of non-coding RNA found in Schizosaccharomyces. It is a megastructure containing several siRNA which use the RNAi pathway to regulate heterochromatin formation. The long RNA transcript forms a secondary structure with several stem-loops which are processed by dicer into siRNA. This siRNA then initiate the formation of heterochromatin at the centromeres of fission yeast. Northern blot analysis confirmed the siRNAs were produced from the large RNA structure RevCen in vivo. As with all siRNAs, the enzyme dicer is responsible for dissecting dsRNA into the 21nt stretch of double-stranded RNA. Human recombinant dicer enzyme processed the RevCen structure in vitro, though the same activity by yeast Dcr1 has not been confirmed.

This is a different mechanism to that involving the well-understood RITS (RNA-induced initiation of transcriptional gene silencing) complex. It has been suggested that both mechanisms work together, with the RevCen structure potentially acting as a backup system when Rdp1-generated double-stranded siRNA precursors are lost.
