= SEPTIN5 =

Protein-coding gene in the species Homo sapiens

An Error has occurred retrieving Wikidata item for infobox Septin-5 is a protein that in humans is encoded by the SEPTIN5 gene (previously SEPT5).

== Function ==
This gene is a member of the septin gene family of nucleotide binding proteins, originally described in yeast as cell division cycle regulatory proteins. Septins are highly conserved in yeast, Drosophila, and mouse and appear to regulate cytoskeletal organization. Disruption of septin function disturbs cytokinesis and results in large multinucleate or polyploid cells. This gene is mapped to 22q11, the region frequently deleted in DiGeorge and velocardiofacial syndromes. A translocation involving the MLL gene and this gene has also been reported in patients with acute myeloid leukemia. Two transcripts of this gene, a major one of 2.2 kb and a minor one of 3.5 kb, have been observed. The 2.2 kb form results from the utilization of a non-consensus polyA signal (AACAAT). In the absence of polyadenylation from this imperfect site, the consensus polyA signal of the downstream neighboring gene (GP1BB; platelet glycoprotein Ib) is used, resulting in the 3.5 kb transcript. An alternatively spliced transcript variant with a different 5' end has also been identified, but its full-length nature has not been completely determined.

== Interactions ==
SEPT5 has been shown to interact with:

- PARK2, and
- SEPT8
