= SEPTIN3 =

Protein-coding gene in the species Homo sapiens

An Error has occurred retrieving Wikidata item for infobox Neuronal-specific septin-3 is a protein that in humans is encoded by the SEPTIN3 gene (previously SEPT3).

== Function ==
This gene belongs to the septin family of GTPases. Members of this family are required for cytokinesis. Expression is upregulated by retinoic acid in a human teratocarcinoma cell line. The specific function of this gene has not been determined. Alternative splicing of this gene results in multiple transcript variants.
