= Small nucleolar RNA snR55/Z10 =

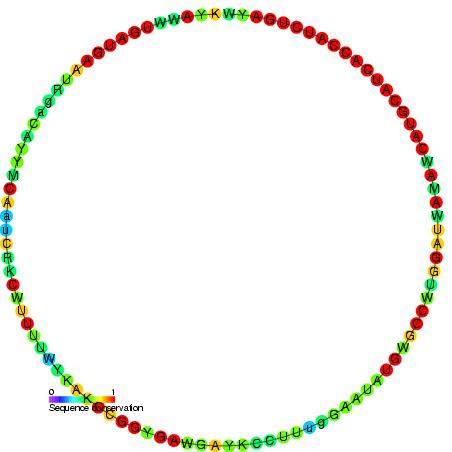
- Predicted secondary structure and sequence conservation of snosnR55

Identifiers
- Symbol: snosnR55
- Rfam: RF00472

Other data
- RNA type: Gene; snRNA; snoRNA; CD-box
- Domain: Eukaryota
- GO: GO:0006396 GO:0005730
- SO: SO:0000593
- PDB structures: PDBe

In molecular biology, Small nucleolar RNA snR55/Z10 is a non-coding RNA (ncRNA) molecule which functions in the biogenesis of other small nuclear RNAs (snRNAs). These small nucleolar RNAs (snoRNAs) are modifying RNAs and usually located in the nucleolus of the eukaryotic cell which is a major site of snRNA biogenesis.

snoRNA snR55 was identified in (Schizosaccharomyces pombe) and has also been called snoRNA Z10. This snoRNA belongs to the C/D box class of snoRNAs which contain the conserved sequence motifs known as the C box (UGAUGA) and the D box (CUGA). Most of the members of the box C/D family function in directing site-specific 2'-O-methylation of substrate RNAs.

This predicted snoRNA does not appear to have the C/D box snoRNA terminal stem structure.
