= Position effect =

Effect on the expression of a gene when its location in a chromosome is changed

Position effect is the effect on the expression of a gene when its location in a chromosome is changed, often by translocation. This has been well described in Drosophila with respect to eye color and is known as position effect variegation (PEV).

The phenotype is well characterised by unstable expression of a gene that results in the red eye coloration. In the mutant flies the eyes typically have a mottled appearance of white and red sectors. These phenotypes are often due to a chromosomal translocation such that the color gene is now close to a region of heterochromatin. Regions of heterochromatin can spread and influence transcription, which may result in the cessation of gene expression and subsequently, white eye sectors.

Position effect is also used to describe the variation of expression exhibited by identical transgenes that insert into different regions of a genome. In this case the difference in expression is often due to enhancers that regulate neighboring genes. These local enhancers can also affect the expression pattern of the transgene. Since each transgenic organism has the transgene in a different location each transgenic organism has the potential for a unique expression pattern.
