= SEPTIN1 =

Protein-coding gene in the species Homo sapiens

An Error has occurred retrieving Wikidata item for infobox Septin-1 is a protein that in humans is encoded by the SEPTIN1 gene. It was renamed from SEPT1 to avoid problems where Microsoft Excel would auto-correct the gene name to the date September 1.

== Function ==
This gene is a member of the septin family of GTPases. Members of this family are required for cytokinesis. This gene encodes a protein associated with the tau-based paired helical filament core, and may contribute to the formation of neurofibrillary tangles in Alzheimer's disease.
