= Septum (cell biology) =

New cell wall that forms between two daughter cells in cell division

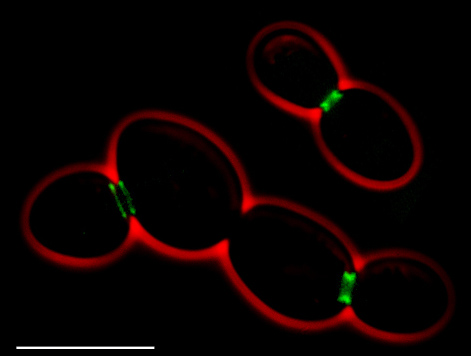
Septins in Saccharomyces cerevisiae (fluorescent micrograph) • Green: septins (AgSEP7-GFP) • Red: cell outline (phase contrast) • Scale bar: 10 μm

A septum in cell biology is the new cell wall that forms between two daughter cells as a result of cell division. Cell division is an extremely complex process that contains four different subprocesses. These processes included the growth of a cell, DNA replication, the process of allocating replicated chromosomes to daughter cells, and septum formation. Ultimately, the septum is the crucial ending to mitosis, meiosis, and the division of bacterial cells. The formation of the septum (a new cell wall) allows the two daughter cells to be separate from one another and perform their respective functions independently.

== Composition ==
In Schizosaccharomyces pombe, the primary septum is composed of linear β(1,3)-D-glucan, β(1,6) branches, and α(1,3)-D-glucan. The secondary septum in Schizosaccharomyces pombe is composed of β(1,6)-D-glucan, β(1,6) branches, and α(1,3)-D-glucan. The synthesis of linear β(1,3)-D-glucan for the primary septum is done by the enzyme β(1,3)-D-glucan synthase and regulated by a Rho GTPase. Ags1/Mok1 enzyme is responsible for the synthesis of α(1,3)-D-glucan in the primary septum and secondary septum.

== Septum formation during binary fission ==
The process of bacterial cell division is defined as binary fission, where a bacterium splits to produce two daughter cells. This division occurs during cytokinesis, which in bacteria is made possible due to the divisome (a specific large protein complex) and FtsZ (the ancestor to tubulin for bacteria that drives cytokinesis itself). This protein machinery works to form the barrier known as the septum between the two daughter cells. At the core of this protein complex is the Z-ring- protofilaments that assemble around the cell at the specific site of cell division. The Z-ring formation is made possible due to certain positioning proteins that depend on the species of the cell. The FtsZ portion of the divisome are protofilaments that are tightly attached to the inside of the cytoplasmic membrane by other proteins, for example in E. coli, FtsA and ZipA assist in securing the protofilaments to the membrane. This FtsZ complex and the membrane attachments are termed as the proto-ring. Once the proto-ring is assembled, FtsA (the ancestor to actin for bacteria) connects the Z ring to the other proteins within the divisome and the constriction of the Z-ring and cytoplasmic membrane begins inward. Such inward constriction causes the cells to form a septum and separate from one another, forming two distinct bacteria cells.

== Septum formation for eukaryotic cells ==
=== Animal cells ===
During cytokinesis in animal cells, a contractile ring made up of actin filaments forms, and this ring pinches to divide the cell into two daughter cells. The cells are able to separate due to the formation of a cleavage furrow, which pinches in a centripetal fashion (from the outside of the cell towards the center of the cell). This cleavage furrow is able to pinch together due to the actin filaments that form the contractile ring. Thus, in animal cells it can be observed that the septum is not a true wall, rather the pinching of a cleavage furrow.

=== Plant cells ===
The manner in which plant cells form a septum is drastically different than that of animal cells. This is because in a plant cell there is no cleavage furrow or pinching of the plasma membrane, rather a cell plate forms in the middle of the cell that then allows the division into two daughter cells. The cell plate formation occurs due to vesicles budding from the golgi apparatus and adding to the plant cell in a centrifugal manner thanks to the directed movement of microtubules (from the center to the outside of the cell).

== Septum formation in fungi ==
In yeast, septins form a ring structure, to which other proteins are recruited. In particular, chitin synthase 2 is required, an enzyme that synthesises chitin thereby building up the primary septum. A secondary septum of β-glucans and mannoproteins is then assembled using the enzyme 1,3-Beta-glucan synthase, and the primary septum degraded during cell separation. After degradation of the primary septum, a chitinous bud scar remains on both the mother and daughter cell.

== Septum formation–related diseases and treatments ==
In regard to septum formation–related diseases, cancer in eukaryotic cells can occur due to mutations that cause different errors in cytokinesis and in the septum formation itself. This is because defects in cytokinesis can affect the number of sets of chromosomes in the cell, and if a defect occurs that leads to a tetraploid cell, there is a high possibility that aneuploid cells could generate from it. This is an issue because the majority of tumors in humans are made up of aneuploid cells. Additionally, if one of the steps of cytokinesis is negatively affected, the formation of the septum could be made impossible which could lead to the formation of more aneuploid cells. For instance, if the cleavage furrow in an animal cell fails to cleave inwards due to the absence of one of its activators such as polo-like kinase 1, the cell remains with double the amount of chromosomes and could lead to cancerous tumors. Along with this, outside factors could influence cytokinesis and septum formation, such as asbestos fibres. These fibres block the process of cytokinesis of occurring due to their carcinogenic nature. Furthermore, certain breast cancers have been linked to the loss of the adhesion between the cell and the matrix. This causes a process known as entosis to occur, which is the uptake of the cell by cells that neighbor it. Such uptake results in multi-nucleation which can cause human breast cancers.

Since the failure of cytokinesis and septum formation can lead to diseases, researchers were able to discover that blocking the formation of the septum by blocking cytokinesis could treat certain bacterial diseases such as Streptococcus. Researchers found that FtsZ could be used as a target, as it has the ability to stop the division of the cell, which causes diseases such as Streptococcus to halt in cell division, and then lyse, causing the diseased cell to no longer be functional. While some inhibitors of FtsZ have been discovered such as sanguinarine, further work is still required for the majority of these inhibitors to be utilized in a clinical setting.
