= Septin-4 =

Protein-coding gene in the species Homo sapiens

SEPTIN4

Identifiers
- Aliases: SEPTIN4, ARTS, BRADEION, CE5B3, H5, MART, PNUTL2, SEP4, hCDCREL-2, hucep-7, septin 4, Sept4, SEPT4
- External IDs: OMIM: 603696; MGI: 1270156; GeneCards: SEPTIN4

Gene location (Human)
Chr.	Chromosome 17 (human)
Band	17q22	Start	58,520,250 bp
Band	17q22	End	58,540,818 bp

Gene location (Mouse)
Chr.	Chromosome 11 (mouse)
Band	11|11 C	Start	87,457,479 bp
Band	11|11 C	End	87,481,365 bp
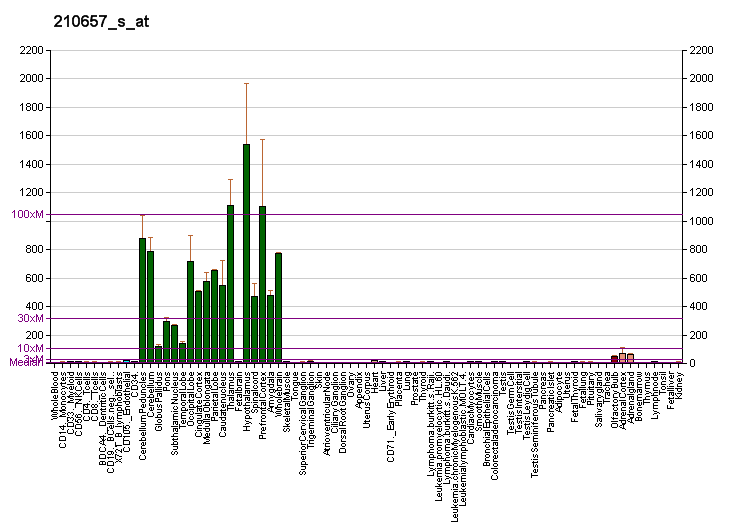
RNA expression pattern
Bgee	Human / Mouse (ortholog); Top expressed in: C1 segment; right hemisphere of cerebellum; middle frontal gyrus; paraflocculus of cerebellum; corpus callosum; external globus pallidus; right frontal lobe; internal globus pallidus; putamen; inferior ganglion of vagus nerve / Top expressed in: lobe of cerebellum; cerebellar vermis; deep cerebellar nuclei; lateral geniculate nucleus; globus pallidus; anterior horn of spinal cord; neural layer of retina; central gray substance of midbrain; superior colliculus; nucleus of stria terminalis; More reference expression data
BioGPS	More reference expression data
Gene ontology
Molecular function	nucleotide binding; structural molecule activity; protein binding; magnesium ion binding; GTPase activity; GTP binding; protein homodimerization activity; molecular adaptor activity
Cellular component	cytoplasm; cell projection; myelin sheath; sperm flagellum; nucleoplasm; mitochondrion; motile cilium; cytoskeleton; nucleus; sperm annulus; septin complex; cilium; septin ring; synaptic vesicle; microtubule cytoskeleton; septin filament array; mitochondrial outer membrane; cytosol
Biological process	regulation of apoptotic process; sperm mitochondrion organization; cell division; brain development; spermatid development; positive regulation of apoptotic process; sperm capacitation; cell cycle; positive regulation of protein ubiquitination; positive regulation of intrinsic apoptotic signaling pathway; apoptotic process; spermatogenesis; cell differentiation; protein homooligomerization; mitotic cytokinesis; septin ring assembly; regulation of exocytosis; cilium assembly; cytoskeleton-dependent cytokinesis
Sources:Amigo / QuickGO
Orthologs
Databases	NCBI: entry; OMA: entry
Species	Human	Mouse
Entrez	5414	18952
Ensembl	ENSG00000108387	ENSMUSG00000020486
UniProt	O43236	P28661
RefSeq (mRNA)	NM_001198713; NM_001256782; NM_001256822; NM_004574; NM_080415 NM_080416; NM_080417	NM_001284392; NM_001284394; NM_001284398; NM_011129; NM_001361936 NM_001368775; NM_001368776; NM_001368777; NM_001368778; NM_001368779
RefSeq (protein)	NP_001185642; NP_001243711; NP_001243751; NP_004565; NP_536340 NP_536341; NP_001350732; NP_001033793; NP_001355700; NP_001355701	NP_001271321; NP_001271323; NP_001271327; NP_035259; NP_001348865 NP_001355704; NP_001355705; NP_001355706; NP_001355707; NP_001355708
Location (UCSC)	Chr 17: 58.52 – 58.54 Mb	Chr 11: 87.46 – 87.48 Mb
PubMed search
- Wikidata
View/Edit Human	View/Edit Mouse

Septin-4 is a protein that in humans is encoded by the gene SEPTIN4 (previously SEPT4). The gene is 2,698 base pairs long, contains one gt-ag intron, and is oriented on the minus strand of DNA. The pre-messenger has 2 exons, and the predicted protein is 570 amino acids long. There are currently no experimental structures for the SEPTIN4 gene product with a sequence identity >90%.

== Function ==
This protein is part of the septin family of nucleotide binding proteins, originally described in yeast as cell division cycle regulatory proteins. Septins are highly conserved in yeast, Drosophila, and mouse and appear to regulate cytoskeletal organization. The protein encoded by this gene is thought to be part of a complex involved in cytokinesis. Alternatively spliced variants which encode different protein isoforms have been described; however, not all variants have been fully characterized.

== Protein properties ==
Although SEPTIN4 is predicted to be an intracellular protein, its exact location is unknown. There is some confidence that the subcellular locations of SEPTIN4 include the cytosol, the nucleus, and mitochondrion. C17orf47 contains a domain of unknown function DUF4655, which has a length characteristic of that DUF family There are three predicted regions of low complexity in SEPTIN4. These regions of low complexity may contain stress-response related terms which involve flexible binding for specific functions. There are three known polymorphic SNPs in SEPTIN4. There are 6 sites of post-translational modification supported by multiple records, according to Phosphosite.

The gene is 2,698 base pairs long, contains one gt-ag intron, and is oriented on the minus strand of DNA. The pre-messenger has 2 exons, and the predicted protein is 570 amino acids long. There are currently no experimental structures for the SEPTIN4 gene product with a sequence identity >90%.

== Homology ==
Sixty-eight other organisms, mostly mammals, have orthologs with SPETIN4.

== Expression ==
There is positive differential mRNA and protein expression of SEPTIN4 in normal tissue of testis. Specifically, nucleolar expression of the gene product occurs in the seminiferous ducts of the testis. While SEPTIN4 is not currently associated with any diseases, several cases of carcinoids displayed strong SEPTIN4 expression via staining with HPA028424 antibody provided by Sigma-Aldrich. Polyphen predicts C17orf47 variants to be benign.

During a study on the endocytic system, a weak but specific association with SEPTIN4 in the regulation of endocytosis was found. Knockdown of SEPTIN4 caused decreased epidermal growth factor endocytosis as well as decreased transferrin endocytosis. In another experiment, knockdown of SEPTIN4 resulted in decreased infection of cells by vaccinia virus.

== Predicted structure ==
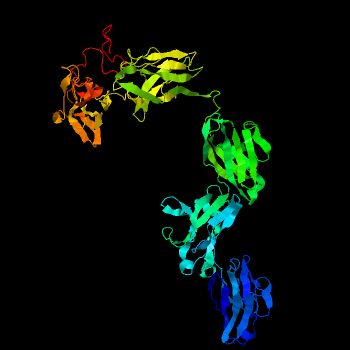
