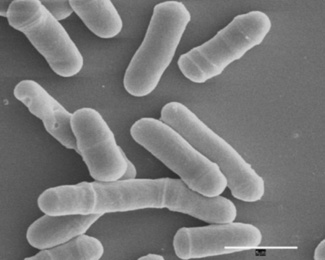
- Microscopic view of a fission yeast culture (Schizosaccharomyces pombe)

Scientific classification
- Kingdom: Fungi
- Division: Ascomycota
- Class: Schizosaccharomycetes
- Order: Schizosaccharomycetales
- Family: Schizosaccharomycetaceae; Beij. ex Klöcker (1905)

Type genus
- Schizosaccharomyces Lindner (1893)

Genera
- “Splitter” Theory (Monophyletic/Polytypic): Hasegawaea; Schizosaccharomyces; Octosporomyces “Lumper” Theory (Paraphyletic/Monotypic): Schizosaccharomyces

= Schizosaccharomycetaceae =

Family of fungi

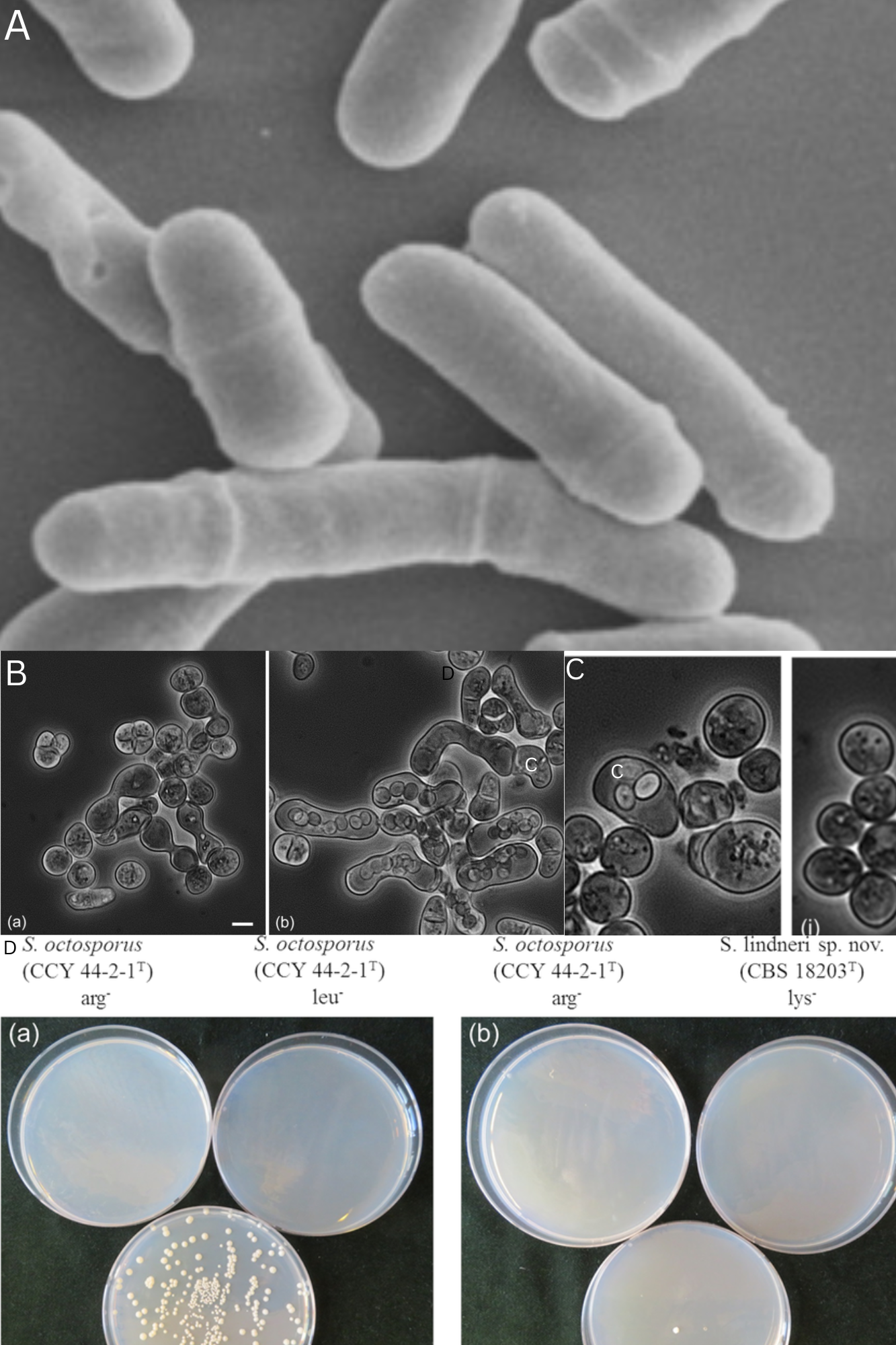
The Schizosaccharomycetaceae are a family of yeasts in the order Schizosaccharomycetales.
