= PEV =

PEV or PeV may refer to:

- Ecologist Party "The Greens" (Partido Ecologista "Os Verdes"), a Portuguese eco-socialist political party
- Green Ecologist Party (Chile), a Chilean eco-leftist political party
- Evangelical People's Party of Switzerland (Parti évangelique suisse), a Protestant Christian-democratic political party in Switzerland
- Petaelectronvolt (PeV), a measure of an amount of kinetic energy
- Plug-in electric vehicle, any road vehicle that can be recharged from an external source of electricity
- Personal electric vehicle (PEV), Personal Electric Vehicles, any battery-operated, motor driven vehicle meant for 1-3 people, anything from 1-500 pounds, including electric motorcycles like the Stark Varg or Damon
- Position-effect variegation, a variegation caused by the silencing of a gene in some cells
- Provincial episcopal visitor, a Church of England bishop assigned to minister to many of the clergy, laity and parishes
- Pevensey & Westham railway station, a railway station in Sussex, England
