= MINK1 =

Protein-coding gene in the species Homo sapiens

Identifiers
- Aliases: MINK1, B55, MAP4K6, MINK, YSK2, ZC3, hMINK, hMINKbeta, misshapen like kinase 1
- External IDs: OMIM: 609426; MGI: 1355329; GeneCards: MINK1
Enzyme activity
EC #	BRENDA	ExPASy	KEGG	MetaCyc
2.7.11.1	↗	↗	↗	↗

Gene location (Human)
Chr.	Chromosome 17 (human)
Band	17p13.2	Start	4,833,340 bp
Band	17p13.2	End	4,898,061 bp

Gene location (Mouse)
Chr.	Chromosome 11 (mouse)
Band	11|11 B3	Start	70,453,707 bp
Band	11|11 B3	End	70,505,309 bp
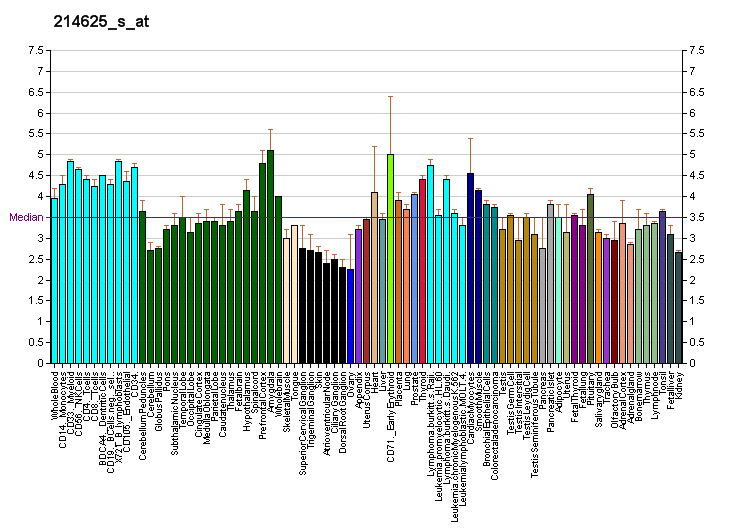

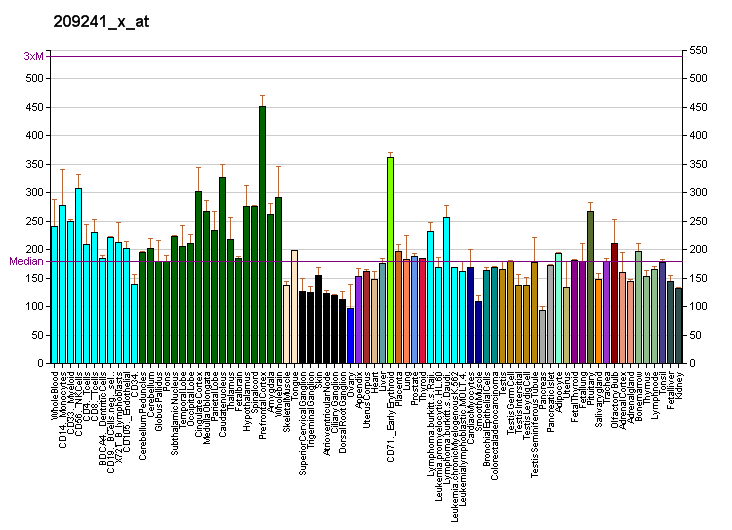

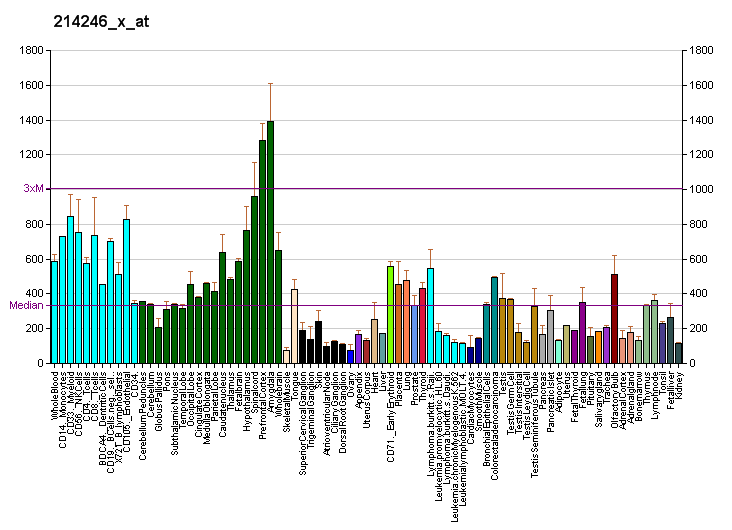
RNA expression pattern
Bgee	Human / Mouse (ortholog); Top expressed in: Region I of hippocampus proper; skin of leg; skin of abdomen; right hemisphere of cerebellum; dorsal motor nucleus of vagus nerve; nipple; olfactory bulb; inferior ganglion of vagus nerve; ventral tegmental area; mucosa of ileum / Top expressed in: visual cortex; superior frontal gyrus; primary visual cortex; dentate gyrus of hippocampal formation granule cell; neural layer of retina; interventricular septum; piriform cortex; lip; cerebellar cortex; subiculum; More reference expression data
BioGPS	More reference expression data
Gene ontology
Molecular function	transferase activity; protein kinase activity; nucleotide binding; kinase activity; protein serine/threonine kinase activity; protein binding; ATP binding; MAP kinase kinase kinase kinase activity
Cellular component	cytoplasm; cytosol; postsynaptic membrane; Golgi apparatus; cell projection; postsynaptic density; membrane; plasma membrane; synapse; cell junction; axon; dendrite; extracellular exosome
Biological process	actin cytoskeleton reorganization; regulation of cell migration; intracellular signal transduction; microvillus assembly; dendrite morphogenesis; phosphorylation; response to stress; positive regulation of JNK cascade; regulation of cell-matrix adhesion; regulation of AMPA receptor activity; multicellular organism development; protein phosphorylation; JNK cascade; regulation of cell-cell adhesion; protein autophosphorylation; chemical synaptic transmission; regulation of mitotic cell cycle; regulation of apoptotic process; neuron projection morphogenesis; MAPK cascade; signal transduction; stress-activated protein kinase signaling cascade; activation of protein kinase activity; positive regulation of p38MAPK cascade
Sources:Amigo / QuickGO
Orthologs
Databases	NCBI: entry; OMA: entry
Species	Human	Mouse
Entrez	50488	50932
Ensembl	ENSG00000141503	ENSMUSG00000020827
UniProt	Q8N4C8	Q9JM52
RefSeq (mRNA)	NM_001024937; NM_015716; NM_153827; NM_170663; NM_001321236	NM_001045959; NM_001045964; NM_016713; NM_176893
RefSeq (protein)	NP_001020108; NP_001308165; NP_056531; NP_722549; NP_733763	NP_001039424; NP_001039429; NP_057922; NP_795712; NP_001390484 NP_001390485; NP_001390486
Location (UCSC)	Chr 17: 4.83 – 4.9 Mb	Chr 11: 70.45 – 70.51 Mb
PubMed search
- Wikidata
View/Edit Human	View/Edit Mouse

Misshapen-like kinase 1 is an enzyme that in humans is encoded by the MINK1 gene.

== Function ==
Misshapen-like kinase 1 is a serine/threonine kinase belonging to the germinal center kinase (GCK) family. The protein is structurally similar to the kinases that are related to NIK and may belong to a distinct subfamily of NIK-related kinases within the GCK family. Studies of the mouse homolog indicate an up-regulation of expression in the course of postnatal mouse cerebral development and activation of the cJun N-terminal kinase (JNK) and the p38 pathways. Alternative splicing occurs at this locus and four transcript variants encoding distinct isoforms have been identified.

== Interactions ==
MINK1 has been shown to interact with NCK1.
