= Septin-14 =

Protein-coding gene in the species Homo sapiens

SEPTIN14

Identifiers
- Aliases: SEPTIN14, septin 14, SEPT14
- External IDs: OMIM: 612140; MGI: 1921472; GeneCards: SEPTIN14

Gene location (Human)
Chr.	Chromosome 7 (human)
Band	7p11.2	Start	55,793,540 bp
Band	7p11.2	End	55,862,755 bp

Gene location (Mouse)
Chr.	Chromosome 5 (mouse)
Band	5|5 G1.3	Start	129,760,455 bp
Band	5|5 G1.3	End	129,785,576 bp
RNA expression pattern
Bgee	Human / Mouse (ortholog); Top expressed in: right testis; left testis; gonad; testicle; blood; monocyte; endometrium; anterior pituitary; right lobe of liver; spleen / Top expressed in: zygote; spermatocyte; secondary oocyte; spermatid; primary oocyte; testicle; More reference expression data
BioGPS	n/a
Gene ontology
Molecular function	nucleotide binding; GTP binding; protein binding; GTPase activity; molecular adaptor activity
Cellular component	cytoplasm; cytoskeleton; septin ring; microtubule cytoskeleton; septin complex; septin filament array
Biological process	cell cycle; cell division; mitotic cytokinesis; septin ring assembly; cilium assembly; cytoskeleton-dependent cytokinesis
Sources:Amigo / QuickGO
Orthologs
Databases	NCBI: entry; OMA: entry
Species	Human	Mouse
Entrez	346288	74222
Ensembl	ENSG00000154997	ENSMUSG00000034219
UniProt	Q6ZU15	Q9DA97
RefSeq (mRNA)	NM_207366	NM_028826
RefSeq (protein)	NP_997249	NP_083102
Location (UCSC)	Chr 7: 55.79 – 55.86 Mb	Chr 5: 129.76 – 129.79 Mb
PubMed search
- Wikidata
View/Edit Human	View/Edit Mouse

Septin-14 is a protein that in humans is encoded by the SEPTIN14 gene (previously SEPT14).

== Function ==
SEPT14 is a member of the highly conserved septin family of GTP-binding cytoskeletal proteins implicated in membrane transport, apoptosis, cell polarity, cell cycle regulation, cytokinesis, and other cellular functions.
