= Paul Lindner =

- Born: 1861; Giesmannsdorf
- Died: 1945 (aged 83–84); Donaueschingen
- Known for: Discovering fission yeast Schizosaccharomyces pombe
- Scientific career
- Fields: Chemistry, Microbiology
- Institutions: Agricultural University of Berlin

Paul Lindner (1861 – 1945) was a German chemist and microbiologist, best known for discovering the fission yeast Schizosaccharomyces pombe.

== Biography and career ==
Lindner was born in 1861 in Giesmannsdorf near the Neisse River, part of Upper Silesia. He was a chemist, biologist, and microbiologist. While conducting research, he served as a professor at the Agricultural University of Berlin's Institute of Fermentation and Starch Production.

In 1893, Lindner discovered the Schizosaccharomyces pombe (S. pombe) species of yeast by isolating it from samples of Bantu beer, a type of East African millet beer. The beer had been sent to Germany in 1890 by Major Hermann von Wissmann, and upon arrival, it was prepared as a pure culture (only the one strain being present).

Lindner named the strain after the Swahili word for beer, "pombe". The original isolate strain Lindner identified in 1893 was homothallic, and it consisted of both + and – mating type cells. This strain featured cells that could undergo pair-wise mating to create asci with four ascospores (asci is the plural word for an ascus, the sexual spore-bearing cell produced in ascomycete fungi).

Lindner's first published description of S. pombe was titled "Schizosaccharomyces pombe sp. nov., a New Ferment." Released in 1893, in the tenth volume of the German brewery weekly Wochenschrift für Brauerei, the article described Lindner's lab's methods, results, and observations. It focused on the work of one of Lindner's employees, Ziedler, and how he purified a pure form of the yeast by using acidified beer wort. Lindner described S. pombe as "thoroughly peculiar" and called it a "fission yeast" due to its lack of asexual reproduction through budding. Lindner's report also included a drawing of their observations with a microscope. The text of the original article was later translated from German into English by translator Ted Crump.

In 1907, Lindner discovered Endomyces fibuliger, a filamentous and ascopore-forming yeast that he observed to generate septate hyphae (hyphae that possess a septa that divides their cells) with many branches in addition to undergoing budding. He died on 4 January 1945, in Donaueschingen.
