= Urs Leupold =

Swiss geneticist (1923–2006)

Urs Leupold

Urs Leupold (July 19, 1923 – October 9, 2006) was a Swiss geneticist whose studies of the fission yeast Schizosaccharomyces pombe were instrumental in establishing this organism as a key model system for eukaryotic cell and molecular biology. Leupold began his studies of S. pombe in 1946 upon encouragement by Øjvind Winge. In 1947, Leupold determined that a culture of S. pombe str. liquefaciens contained strains expressing four distinct mating types: h^{40}, h^{90}, h^{+}, and h^{−}. Most current S. pombe laboratory strains are derived from the h^{90}, h^{+}, and h^{−} strains known as 968, 975, and 972.

Leupold went on to carry out postdoctoral studies with Norman Horowitz at Caltech and with Boris Ephrussi at the University of Paris. Notably, with Norman Horowitz, Leupold isolated the first conditional (temperature sensitive) mutations in the bacterium Escherichia coli as part of an effort to address criticisms raised by Max Delbrück of the one gene-one enzyme hypothesis

In 1952, Leupold returned to studying S. pombe first at the University of Zürich from 1952 to 1963 and then as head of the Institute of General Microbiology at the University of Bern from 1963 to 1986. During this time, his laboratory made major contributions to the understanding of genetic mutations and suppressors in S. pombe, as well as the construction of a genetic map of this yeast. As the recognized leader in fission yeast genetics, Leupold had a great impact on the first generation of scientists to use S. pombe for genetic studies. In 1973, Paul Nurse spent a couple months with Leupold to learn S. pombe genetics before beginning his seminal studies on cell cycle control with Murdoch Mitchison in Edinburgh, Scotland. Other notable S. pombe scientists who trained with Leupold include Peter Munz, Jürg Kohli, Herbert Gutz, Matthias Sipiczki and the late Pierre Thuriaux.
