= NCKIPSD =

Protein-coding gene in the species Homo sapiens

Identifiers
- Aliases: NCKIPSD, AF3P21, DIP, DIP1, ORF1, SPIN90, VIP54, WASLBP, WISH, NCK interacting protein with SH3 domain
- External IDs: OMIM: 606671; MGI: 1931834; GeneCards: NCKIPSD

Gene location (Human)
Chr.	Chromosome 3 (human)
Band	3p21.31	Start	48,673,844 bp
Band	3p21.31	End	48,686,364 bp
RNA expression pattern
Bgee	Human / Mouse (ortholog); Top expressed in: right frontal lobe; prefrontal cortex; middle temporal gyrus; primary visual cortex; Brodmann area 9; right hemisphere of cerebellum; Brodmann area 23; right auricle of heart; anterior cingulate cortex; superior frontal gyrus / n/a; More reference expression data
BioGPS	n/a
Gene ontology
Molecular function	SH3 domain binding; cytoskeletal protein binding; protein binding
Cellular component	COP9 signalosome; cytosol; intermediate filament; nucleus
Biological process	cytoskeleton organization; Fc-gamma receptor signaling pathway involved in phagocytosis; signal transduction; NLS-bearing protein import into nucleus; positive regulation of neuron projection development
Sources:Amigo / QuickGO
Orthologs
Databases	NCBI: entry; OMA: entry
Species	Human	Mouse
Entrez	51517	80987
Ensembl	ENSG00000213672	ENSMUSG00000032598
UniProt	Q9NZQ3	Q9ESJ4
RefSeq (mRNA)	NM_184231; NM_016453	NM_030729
RefSeq (protein)	NP_057537; NP_909119	NP_109654
Location (UCSC)	Chr 3: 48.67 – 48.69 Mb	n/a
PubMed search
- Wikidata
View/Edit Human	View/Edit Mouse

NCK-interacting protein with SH3 domain is a protein that in humans is encoded by the NCKIPSD gene.

The protein encoded by this gene is localized exclusively in the cell nucleus. It plays a role in signal transduction, and may function in the maintenance of sarcomeres and in the assembly of myofibrils into sarcomeres. It also plays an important role in stress fiber formation. The gene is involved in therapy-related leukemia by a chromosomal translocation t(3;11)(p21;q23) that involves this gene and the myeloid/lymphoid leukemia gene. Alternative splicing occurs in this locus and two transcript variants encoding distinct isoforms have been identified.

== Interactions ==
NCKIPSD has been shown to interact with Grb2 and NCK1.
