= Centric heterochromatin =

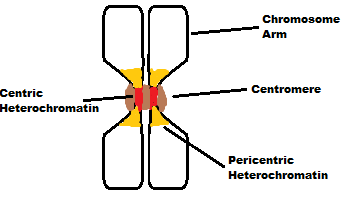
Mitoticchromosome

Centric heterochromatin, a variety of heterochromatin, is a tightly packed form of DNA. Centric heterochromatin is a constituent in the formation of active centromeres in most higher-order organisms; the domain exists on both mitotic and interphase chromosomes.

Centric heterochromatin is usually formed on alpha satellite DNA in humans; however, there have been cases where centric heterochromatin and centromeres have formed on originally euchromatin domains lacking alpha satellite DNA; this usually happens as a result of a chromosome breakage event and the formed centromere is called a neocentromere.

Centric heterochromatin domains are flanked by pericentric heterochromatin.

== Transcription ==
Despite its compact state, centromeric satellite DNA is transcribed at low levels into non-coding RNAs, which help maintain centromeric heterochromatin and recruit centromere and kinetochore proteins. In human cells, centromeric transcription continues through early G1, when CENP-A is deposited, and experiments in Drosophila cells indicate that short transcriptional inhibition impairs stable centromeric CENP-A incorporation. Both reduced and excessive centromeric transcription are associated with chromosome-segregation defects.

== See also ==
- Heterochromatin
