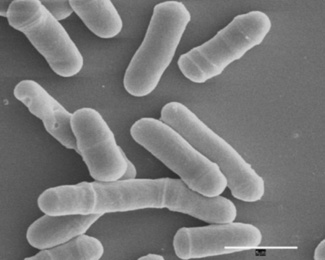
- Schizosaccharomyces pombe

Scientific classification
- Kingdom: Fungi
- Division: Ascomycota
- Class: Schizosaccharomycetes
- Order: Schizosaccharomycetales
- Family: Schizosaccharomycetaceae
- Genus: Schizosaccharomyces; Lindner

Species
- With debated Species: S. cryophilus; S. japonicus; S. octosporus; S. osmophilus; S. pombe; Without debated Species: S. cryophilus; S. osmophilus; S. pombe

= Schizosaccharomyces =

Genus of fungi

Schizosaccharomyces is a genus of fission yeasts. The most well-studied species is S. pombe. At present five Schizosaccharomyces species have been described (S. pombe, S. japonicus, S. octosporus, S. cryophilus and S. osmophilus). Like the distantly related Saccharomyces cerevisiae, S. pombe is a significant model organism in the study of eukaryotic cell biology. It is particularly useful in evolutionary studies because it is thought to have diverged from the Saccharomyces cerevisiae lineage between 300 million and 1 billion years ago, and thus provides an evolutionarily distant comparison.

== See also ==
- Yeast in winemaking
