= Septin-12 =

Protein-coding gene in the species Homo sapiens

SEPTIN12

Identifiers
- Aliases: SEPTIN12, SPGF10, septin 12, SEPT12
- External IDs: OMIM: 611562; MGI: 1918339; GeneCards: SEPTIN12

Gene location (Human)
Chr.	Chromosome 16 (human)
Band	16p13.3	Start	4,777,606 bp
Band	16p13.3	End	4,788,398 bp

Gene location (Mouse)
Chr.	Chromosome 16 (mouse)
Band	16|16 A1	Start	4,804,722 bp
Band	16|16 A1	End	4,815,716 bp
RNA expression pattern
Bgee	Human / Mouse (ortholog); Top expressed in: left testis; right testis; testicle; cerebellar cortex; cerebellar hemisphere; right hemisphere of cerebellum; primary visual cortex; C1 segment; medulla oblongata; mucosa of transverse colon / Top expressed in: seminiferous tubule; spermatocyte; spermatid; blastocyst; morula; secondary oocyte; gastrula; zygote; primary oocyte; mucosa of small intestine; More reference expression data
BioGPS	n/a
Gene ontology
Molecular function	nucleotide binding; GTP binding; protein binding; phosphatidylinositol binding; protein homodimerization activity; GDP binding; identical protein binding; GTPase activity; molecular adaptor activity
Cellular component	cytoplasm; microtubule cytoskeleton; perinuclear region of cytoplasm; sperm annulus; spindle; cell projection; midbody; cleavage furrow; motile cilium; cytoskeleton; cilium; stress fiber; septin complex; nucleus; septin ring; septin filament array
Biological process	cell cycle; cell division; sperm motility; spermatogenesis; cell differentiation; flagellated sperm motility; mitotic cytokinesis; septin ring assembly; cilium assembly; cytoskeleton-dependent cytokinesis
Sources:Amigo / QuickGO
Orthologs
Databases	NCBI: entry; OMA: entry
Species	Human	Mouse
Entrez	124404	71089
Ensembl	ENSG00000140623	ENSMUSG00000022542
UniProt	Q8IYM1	n/a
RefSeq (mRNA)	NM_001154458; NM_144605	NM_027669; NM_029374; NM_001373945
RefSeq (protein)	NP_001147930; NP_653206	n/a
Location (UCSC)	Chr 16: 4.78 – 4.79 Mb	Chr 16: 4.8 – 4.82 Mb
PubMed search
- Wikidata
View/Edit Human	View/Edit Mouse

Septin-12 is a protein that in humans is encoded by the SEPTIN12 gene (previously SEPT12).

== Function ==
This gene encodes a guanine-nucleotide binding protein and member of the septin family of cytoskeletal GTPases. Septins play important roles in cytokinesis, exocytosis, embryonic development, and membrane dynamics. Multiple transcript variants encoding different isoforms have been found for this gene.
