= Position-effect variegation =

Position-effect variegation (PEV) is a variegation caused by the silencing of a gene in some cells through its abnormal juxtaposition with heterochromatin via rearrangement or transposition. It is also associated with changes in chromatin conformation.

== Overview ==
The classical example is the Drosophila w^{m4} (speak white-mottled-4) translocation. In this mutation, an inversion on the X chromosome placed the white gene next to pericentric heterochromatin, or a sequence of repeats that becomes heterochromatic. Normally, the white gene is expressed in every cell of the adult Drosophila eye resulting in a red-eye phenotype. In the w[m4] mutant, the eye color was variegated (red-white mosaic colored) where the white gene was expressed in some cells in the eyes and not in others. The mutation was described first by Hermann Muller in 1930. PEV is a heterochromatin-induced gene inactivation. Gene silencing phenomena similar to this have also been observed in S. cerevisiae and S. pombe.

Typically, the barrier DNA sequences prevent the heterochromatic region from spreading into the euchromatin but they are no longer present in the flies that inherit certain chromosomal rearrangements.

== Etymology ==
PEV is a position effect because the change in position of a gene from its original position to somewhere near a heterochromatic region has an effect on its expression. The effect is the variegation in a particular phenotype i.e., the appearance of irregular patches of different colour(s), due to the expression of the original wild-type gene in some cells of the tissue but not in others, as seen in the eye of mutated Drosophila melanogaster.

However, it is possible that the effect of the silenced gene is not phenotypically visible in some cases. PEV was observed first in Drosophila because it was one of the first organisms on which X-ray irradiation was used as a mutation inducer. X-rays can cause chromosomal rearrangements that can result in PEV.

== Mechanisms ==
Among a number of models, two epigenetic models are popular. One is the cis-spreading of the heterochromatin past the rearrangement breakpoint. The trans-interactions come in when the cis-spreading model is unable to explain certain phenomena.

=== cis-spreading ===
According to this model, the heterochromatin forces an altered chromatin conformation on the euchromatic region. Due to this, the transcriptional machinery cannot access the gene which leads to the inhibition of transcription. In other words, the heterochromatin spreads and causes gene silencing by packaging the normally euchromatic region. But this model fails to explain some aspects of PEV. For example, variegation can be induced in a gene located several megabases from the heterochromatin-euchromatin breakpoint due to rearrangements in that breakpoint. Also, the austerity of the variegated phenotype can be altered by the distance of the heterochromatic region from the breakpoint.

This suggests that trans-interactions are crucial for PEV.

=== trans-interactions ===
These are interactions between the different heterochromatic regions and the global chromosomal organisation in the interphase nucleus. The rearrangements due to PEV places the reporter gene in a new compartment of the nucleus where the transcriptional machinery required is not available, thus silencing the gene and modifying the chromatin structure.

These two mechanisms affect each other as well. Which mechanism dominates to influence the phenotype depends upon the type of heterochromatin and the intricacy of the rearrangement.

== Suppression in Drosophila melanogaster ==
The mutations in mus genes are the candidates as PEV modifiers, as these genes are involved in chromosome maintenance and repair. Chromosome structure in the vicinity of the breakpoint appears to be an important determinant of the gene inactivation process. Six second chromosomal mus mutations were isolated with w^{m4}. A copy of wild-type white gene was placed adjacent to heterochromatin. The different mus mutants that were taken were: mus201^{D1}, mus205^{B1}, mus208^{B1}, mus209^{B1}, mus210^{B1}, mus211^{B1}. A stock was constructed with the replacement of standard X-chromosome with w^{m4}. It was observed that the suppression of PEV is not a characteristic of mus mutations in general. Only for homozygous mus209^{B1}, the variegation was significantly suppressed. Also, when homozygous, 2735 and D-1368 and all heteroallelic combinations of its Pcna mutations strongly suppress PEV.

== In other organisms ==
=== In mouse ===
In mouse, variegating coat colour has been observed. When an autosomal region carrying a fur color gene is inserted onto the X chromosome, variable silencing of the allele is seen. Variegation is, however, observed only in the female having this insertion along with a homozygous mutation in the original coat color gene. The wild-type allele gets inactivated due to heterochromatinization.

=== In plants ===
In plants, PEV has been observed in Oenothera blandina. The silencing of euchromatic genes occurs when the genes get placed into a new heterochromatic neighborhood.

== See also ==
- Friedreich's ataxia

== Additional selected references ==
- Aagaard L., Laible G., Selenko P., Schmid M., Dorn R., Schotta G., Kuhfittig S., Wolf A., Lebersorger A., Singh P. B., Reuter G., Jenuwein T. (1999). "Functional mammalian homologues of the Drosophila PEV-modifier Su(var)3- 9 encode centromere-associated proteins which complex with the heterochromatin component M31". EMBO J. 18 (7): 1923–38. doi:10.1093/emboj/18.7.1923. PMC 1171278. PMID 10202156.
- Buchner K., Roth P., Schotta G., Krauss V., Saumweber H., Reuter G., Dorn R. (2000). "Genetic and molecular complexity of the position effect variegation modifier mod(mdg4) in Drosophila". Genetics. 155 (1): 141–57. doi:10.1093/genetics/155.1.141. PMC 1461079. PMID 10790390.
- Dorn R., Krauss V., Reuter G., Saumweber H. (1993). "The enhancer of position-effect variegation of Drosophila, E(var)3-93D, codes for a chromatin protein containing a conserved domain common to several transcriptional regulators". Proc Natl Acad Sci U S A. 90 (23): 11376–80. Bibcode:1993PNAS...9011376D. doi:10.1073/pnas.90.23.11376. PMC 47985. PMID 8248257.
- Ebert A., Schotta G., Lein S., Kubicek S., Krauss V., Jenuwein T., Reuter G. (2004). "Su(var) genes regulate the balance between euchromatin and heterochromatin in Drosophila". Genes Dev. 18 (23): 2973–83. doi:10.1101/gad.323004. PMC 534657. PMID 15574598.
- Eissenberg J. C., Morris G. D., Reuter G., Hartnett T. (1992). "The heterochromatin-associated protein HP-1 is an essential protein in Drosophila with dosage-dependent effects on position-effect variegation". Genetics. 131 (2): 345–352. doi:10.1093/genetics/131.2.345. PMC 1205009. PMID 1644277.
- Jenuwein T., Laible G., Dorn R., Reuter G. (1998). "SET domain proteins modulate chromatin domains in eu- and heterochromatin". Cell Mol Life Sci. 54 (1): 80–93. doi:10.1007/s000180050127. PMC 11147257. PMID 9487389. S2CID 7769686.
- Schotta G., Ebert A., Krauss V., Fischer A., Hoffmann J., Rea S., Jenuwein T., Dorn R., Reuter G. (2002). "Central role of Drosophila SU(VAR)3-9 in histone H3-K9 methylation and heterochromatic gene silencing". EMBO J. 21 (5): 1121–31. doi:10.1093/emboj/21.5.1121. PMC 125909. PMID 11867540.
- Tschiersch B., Hofmann A., Krauss V., Dorn R., Korge G., Reuter G. (1994). "The protein encoded by the Drosophila position-effect variegation suppressor gene Su(var)3-9 combines domains of antagonistic regulators of homeotic gene complexes". EMBO J. 13 (16): 3822–31. doi:10.1002/j.1460-2075.1994.tb06693.x. PMC 395295. PMID 7915232.
