= Richard Yuqi Zhao =

Chinese-American Virus Pathologist

- 赵玉琪
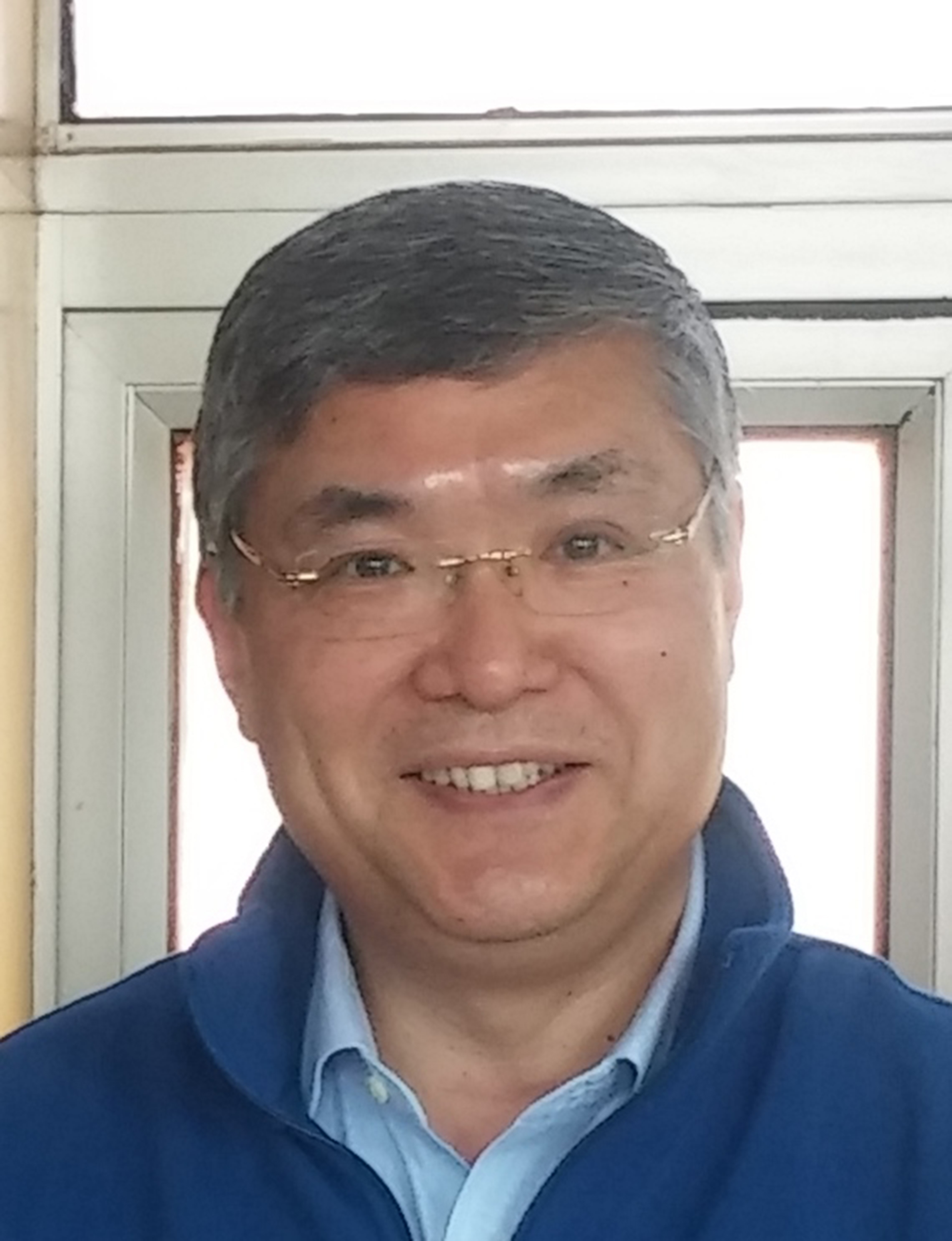
- Zhao in 2016
- Born: May 20, 1957 (age 69); Qingdao, Shandong, China
- Education: Ocean University of China (B.S.); Oregon State University (MS, PhD)
- Known for: Use of fission yeast models for virus research
- Awards: Fellow of the American Academy of Microbiology (2019); Fellow of the American Association for the Advancement of Science (2025)
- Scientific career
- Fields: Molecular virology, Molecular pathology

Richard Yuqi Zhao (Chinese: 赵玉琪; pinyin: Zhào Yùqí; born May 20, 1957) is a Chinese-American biomedical researcher and molecular pathologist. He is a professor of pathology and director of the Molecular Diagnostics Laboratory at the University of Maryland School of Medicine and the University of Maryland Medical Center.

Zhao has received media attention for the novel use of fission yeast (Schizosaccharomyces pombe) as a model system for studying the Zika virus. He is a Fellow of the American Academy of Microbiology and the AAAS.

== Early life and education ==
Zhao was born in Qingdao, Shandong Province, China, to a working-class family. His father, Zhao Fenghe, was a steel worker, and his mother, Ma Guizhen, was a tailor. Zhao attended Qingdao No. 9 High School. After high school, he worked as a riveter at the Qingdao Port Authority. He entered the Ocean University of China in 1977 and graduated with a B.S. degree in marine biology.

He later immigrated to the United States as part of an exchange program, receiving his M.S. and Ph.D. degrees in genetics and molecular biology at Oregon State University. He completed postdoctoral training in the molecular genetics of fission yeast in 1993, subsequently becoming a junior research faculty member at the Columbia University College of Physicians and Surgeons.

== Career ==
Following his time at Columbia, Zhao joined the faculty of Northwestern University Feinberg School of Medicine in 1994, conducting research at the "Children's Memorial Institute for Education and Research" (CMIER), the research arm of Children’s Memorial Hospital in Chicago. There, he studied the use of fission yeast as a model system for investigating HIV-1 pathogenesis and served as director of the Molecular Diagnostics Laboratory at Children's Memorial Hospital. In 2001, Zhao was named the Bernard L. Mirkin, Ph.D., M.D., Research Scholar, an endowed research position established by Children's Memorial Hospital and Northwestern University Medical School. In this role, he contributed to the development and clinical application of molecular diagnostic assays for HIV-1 infection, including the use of branched-DNA, TaqMan, and sequencing-based methodologies.

In 2004, Zhao joined the faculty at the University of Maryland School of Medicine. He later became head of the Division of Molecular Pathology and director of the Molecular Diagnostics Laboratory at the University of Maryland Medical Center. From 2011 to 2013, Zhao served as President of the Faculty Senate of the University of Maryland, Baltimore (UMB). During his tenure, he represented the faculty on a study team examining the proposed merger of UMB with the University of Maryland, College Park (UMCP), and publicly opposed the proposal, arguing that UMB's independence preserved its distinctive culture and competitive advantages and that greater collaboration between the two universities could be achieved without merging.

Zhao is currently a professor of pathology, microbiology–immunology, human virology, and global health at the University of Maryland School of Medicine.

== Research ==
Independent reviews of yeast-based virology research have cited Zhao's work as contributing to the development and application of fission yeast models for the study of human viruses, including HIV-1, Zika virus, and SARS-CoV-2. His research has included studies of viral pathogenesis and virus-host interactions involving these viruses. His laboratory reported a comprehensive functional characterization of the Zika virus genome using a fission yeast platform, identifying seven viral proteins with cytopathic activities. These findings received coverage from multiple news outlets, including The Baltimore Sun, Newsweek, ScienceDaily, and Xinhua News Agency.

Zhao's fission yeast-based approaches were also applied to plant virology, including collaborative studies of Barley yellow dwarf virus and other plant viral proteins that identified conserved mechanisms regulating cell-cycle progression in both plant and animal systems.

In addition to virology research, Zhao has contributed to the development and application of molecular diagnostic assays for HIV-1 infection. His work included studies involving branched-DNA viral load testing, TaqMan-based quantification of HIV-1 proviral DNA, and sequencing-based approaches for HIV drug-resistance testing.

Zhao has also participated in public communication and education concerning HIV/AIDS and COVID-19 through media interviews and public discussions in both the United States and China. In 2005, he served as guest editor of a special issue of Cell Research entitled HIV/AIDS in China, which covered both the epidemiology of the disease as well as its scientific and social impact within the country, and included Zhao's own contributions and those of his frequent collaborator Robert Gallo. China News Service described the issue as the first English-language collection of scientific articles devoted to HIV/AIDS in China.

== Honors and recognition ==
Zhao was elected a Fellow of the American Academy of Microbiology in 2019 and a Fellow of the American Association for the Advancement of Science (AAAS) as part of the 2025 class.According to the official AAAS nomination, the recognition was for: "pioneering virologic research using fission yeast models to study human viruses, advancing public education on HIV/AIDS and COVID-19, and for integrating molecular biology into clinical diagnostics, now widely recognized as molecular pathology."
