= SEPTIN6 =

Protein-coding gene in the species Homo sapiens

Identifiers
- Aliases: SEPTIN6, SEP2, SEPT2, septin 6, SEPT6
- External IDs: OMIM: 300683; MGI: 1888939; GeneCards: SEPTIN6
Available structures
PDB	Ortholog search: PDBe RCSB
PDB	List of PDB id codes 2QAG

Gene location (Human)
Chr.	X chromosome (human)
Band	Xq24	Start	119,615,724 bp
Band	Xq24	End	119,693,370 bp

Gene location (Mouse)
Chr.	X chromosome (mouse)
Band	X|X A3.3	Start	36,174,979 bp
Band	X|X A3.3	End	36,255,447 bp
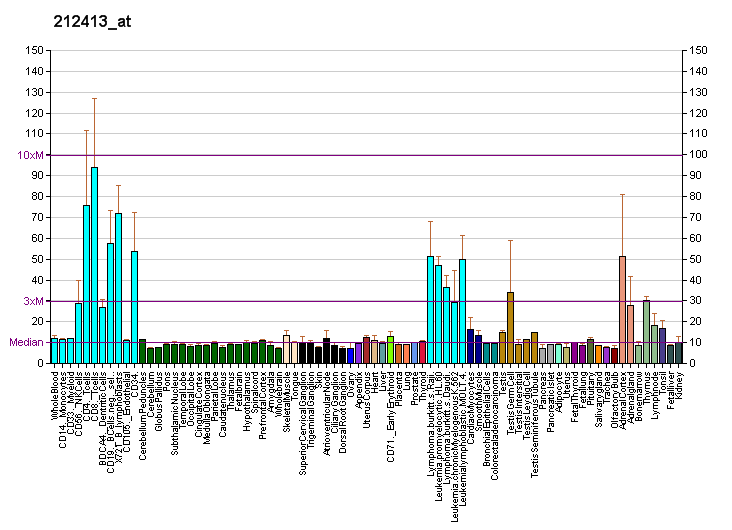

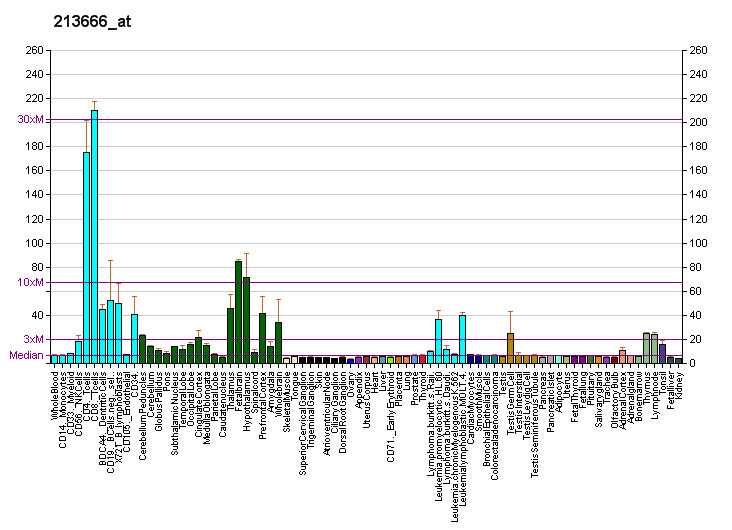

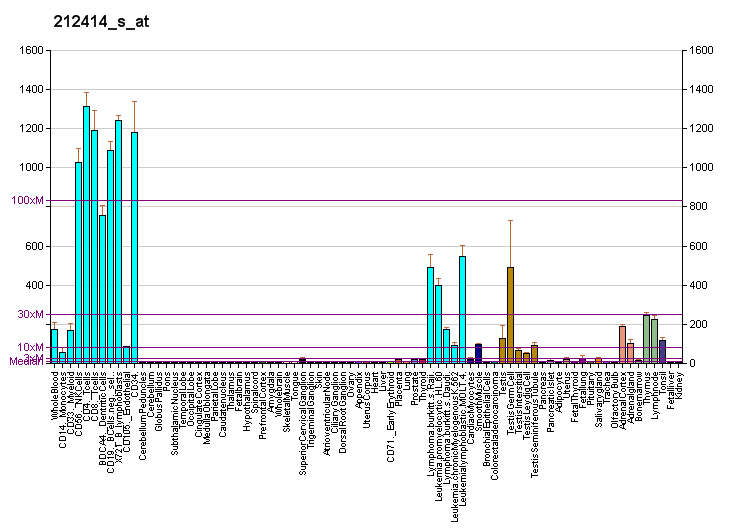
RNA expression pattern
Bgee	Human / Mouse (ortholog); Top expressed in: thymus; lymph node; granulocyte; right adrenal cortex; appendix; left adrenal gland; left adrenal cortex; blood; bone marrow cell; spleen / Top expressed in: barrel cortex; lumbar spinal ganglion; facial motor nucleus; habenula; thymus; medial geniculate nucleus; medial dorsal nucleus; substantia nigra; motor neuron; blood; More reference expression data
BioGPS	More reference expression data
Gene ontology
Molecular function	nucleotide binding; GTP binding; protein binding; GTPase activity; molecular adaptor activity
Cellular component	cytoplasm; axon terminus; spindle; midbody; cleavage furrow; chromosome, centromeric region; cytoskeleton; synaptic vesicle; kinetochore; chromosome; septin ring; septin collar; septin complex; sperm annulus; cell projection; motile cilium; cilium; presynapse; microtubule cytoskeleton; septin filament array
Biological process	cell cycle; viral process; cell division; spermatogenesis; cell differentiation; mitotic cytokinesis; septin ring assembly; cilium assembly; cytoskeleton-dependent cytokinesis
Sources:Amigo / QuickGO
Orthologs
Databases	NCBI: entry; OMA: entry
Species	Human	Mouse
Entrez	23157	56526
Ensembl	ENSG00000125354	ENSMUSG00000050379
UniProt	Q14141	Q9R1T4
RefSeq (mRNA)	NM_015129; NM_145799; NM_145800; NM_145802	NM_001177323; NM_001177324; NM_001253706; NM_019942; NM_001359140 NM_001359141; NM_001359142
RefSeq (protein)	NP_055944; NP_665798; NP_665799; NP_665801	NP_001170794; NP_001170795; NP_001240635; NP_064326; NP_001346069 NP_001346070; NP_001346071
Location (UCSC)	Chr X: 119.62 – 119.69 Mb	Chr X: 36.17 – 36.26 Mb
PubMed search
- Wikidata
View/Edit Human	View/Edit Mouse

Septin-6 is a protein that in humans is encoded by the SEPTIN6 gene (previously SEPT6).

== Function ==
This gene is a member of the septin family of GTPases. Members of this family are required for cytokinesis. This gene encodes four transcript variants encoding three distinct isoforms. An additional transcript variant has been identified, but its biological validity has not been determined.

== Clinical significance ==
One version of pediatric acute myeloid leukemia is the result of a reciprocal translocation between chromosomes 11 and X, with the breakpoint associated with the genes encoding the mixed-lineage leukemia and septin 2 proteins.

== Interactions ==
SEPT6 has been shown to interact with SEPT2.
