= Heterochromatin =

Compact and highly condensed form of chromatin

Heterochromatin is a tightly packed form of chromatin, which comes in multiple varieties. These varieties lie on a continuum between the two extremes of constitutive heterochromatin and facultative heterochromatin. Both play a role in the expression of genes, and correlate with late replication timing. Importantly, heterochromatin was once thought to be tightly coupled with structural compactness, phase separation and also deterministic transcriptional silencing. However, these notions have been increasingly challenged in recent years.

Many epigenetic marks are associated with heterochromatin. The two major ones are H3K27me3 and H3K9me2/me3. Other heterochromatin-associated marks include H4K20me3, H3K56me3, and H3K64me3. Canonically, H3K27me3 is more often associated with facultative heterochromatin, whereas H3K9 is more often associated with constitutive heterochromatin. In many current naming conventions, the former is referred to as "Polycomb" because of its interactions with Polycomb family proteins, whereas the latter is referred to more simply as "heterochromatin."

== Structure ==
Heterochromatin vs. euchromatin

Chromatin is found in two varieties: euchromatin and heterochromatin. Originally, the two forms were distinguished cytologically by how intensely they stain – the euchromatin is less intense, while heterochromatin stains intensely, indicating tighter packing. Heterochromatin was given its name for this reason by botanist Emil Heitz who discovered that heterochromatin remained darkly stained throughout the entire cell cycle, unlike euchromatin whose stain disappeared during interphase. Despite this early dichotomy, recent evidence in both animals and plants has suggested that there are more than two distinct heterochromatin states. Each is marked by different combinations of epigenetic marks and may depend on other genomic and nuclear contexts, e.g. lamina interactions.

Historically, early imaging-based studies of heterochromatin were more reflective of constitutive heterochromatin, because those regions were the most readily visible by staining. With the development of more advanced imaging methods and their combination with sequencing-based approaches such as ChIP-seq and CUT&RUN, understanding of heterochromatin structure, especially that of facultative heterochromatin, has advanced significantly beyond the simple dichotomy. At the same time, many unresolved questions remain, including whether these domains phase separate, whether they behave more like liquids, solids, or gel-like states, and how and why they transition during cell-fate changes.

== Function ==
General model for duplication of heterochromatin during cell division

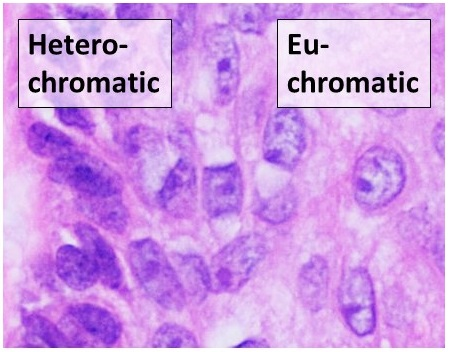
Microscopy of heterochromatic versus euchromatic nuclei (H&E stain).

Heterochromatin has been associated with several functions, from gene regulation to the protection of chromosome integrity; some of these roles can be attributed to the dense packing of DNA, which makes it less accessible to protein factors that usually bind DNA or its associated factors. For example, naked double-stranded DNA ends would usually be interpreted by the cell as damaged or viral DNA, triggering cell cycle arrest, DNA repair or destruction of the fragment, such as by endonucleases in bacteria.

Heterochromatin is generally clonally inherited; when a cell divides, the two daughter cells typically retain heterochromatin in the same regions of DNA, resulting in epigenetic inheritance. The exact mechanism of this inheritance is still unknown, but the role of 3D organization is now recognized as an important component. The integrity of heterochromatic regions of the genome is also critical for cell-fate transition and proper differentiation, as existing heterochromatin can interact with transcription factors and undergo both large-scale and local reorganization. For example, during zygotic activation, H3K9me3 undergoes drastic expansion together with changes in other epigenetic marks, such as DNA methylation. In this sense, the term "constitutive" should not imply that such heterochromatin is always static and fully preserved.

Variations cause heterochromatin to encroach on adjacent genes or recede from genes at the extremes of domains. Transcribable material may be repressed by being positioned (in cis) at these boundary domains. This gives rise to expression levels that vary from cell to cell, which may be demonstrated by position-effect variegation. Insulator sequences may act as a barrier in rare cases where constitutive heterochromatin and highly active genes are juxtaposed (e.g. the 5'HS4 insulator upstream of the chicken β-globin locus, and loci in two Saccharomyces spp.).

== Constitutive heterochromatin ==
Canonically, constitutive heterochromatin is associated with many genomic and nuclear features, including dense packing, repeat-rich or satellite-containing DNA, lamina association, B-compartment localization, transcriptional silence, low expression, low chromatin accessibility as measured by ATAC-seq, and late replication timing. All human chromosomes 1, 9, 16, and the Y chromosome contain large regions of constitutive heterochromatin. In most organisms, constitutive heterochromatin occurs around centromeres and near telomeres. Both centromeres and telomeres are heterochromatic, as is the Barr body of the second, inactivated X chromosome in females. Constitutive heterochromatin can also affect nearby genes, for example through position-effect variegation.

== Facultative heterochromatin ==
Schematic karyogram of a human, showing an overview of the human genome using G banding, which is a method that includes Giemsa staining, wherein the lighter staining regions are generally more euchromatic, whereas darker regions generally are more heterochromatic.

The regions of DNA packaged in facultative heterochromatin are not consistent among cell types within a species, hence the name "facultative." Unlike constitutive heterochromatin, facultative heterochromatin populates both A and B compartments, shows weak correlation with chromatin accessibility measured by ATAC-seq, and does not phase separate into dense domains. Its relation to gene regulation, e.g. how H3K27me3 coordinates gene silencing is also unclear. An emerging picture is that facultative heterochromatic repression decreases the rate of transcriptional bursting rather than eliminating it.

The formation of facultative heterochromatin is regulated, and is often associated with morphogenesis or differentiation. An example of facultative heterochromatin is X chromosome inactivation in female mammals: one X chromosome is packaged as facultative heterochromatin and silenced, while the other X chromosome is packaged as euchromatin and expressed.

Among the molecular components that appear to regulate the spreading of heterochromatin are the Polycomb-group proteins and non-coding genes such as Xist. The current picture of how H3K27me3 spreads and gets maintained is a coordination of enzymatic-level positive feedback via allosteric activation of PRC2 and long-range 3D spreading on chromatin.

There are two types of PRC proteins: PRC1 and PRC2. Among PRC1, there are variant PRC1 and canonical PRC1. vPRC1 recognizes certain binding motifs on DNA and deposits H2AK119ub1, which also help co-recruit PRC2, the enzyme depositing H3K27 methylation. cPRC1 recognizes H3K27me3 and compact chromatin by its own protein-protein interactions. However, the above picture is anything but a simplification to the molecular details of the complex PRC family. Whether they really form a feedback loop, or just a linear dependency is still under debate. Nevertheless, their functional relevant is high. PRC-mediated epigenetic aberrations are linked to genome instability and malignancy and play a role in the DNA damage response, DNA repair and in the fidelity of replication.

== Yeast heterochromatin ==
Saccharomyces cerevisiae, or budding yeast, is a model eukaryote and its heterochromatin has been defined thoroughly. Although most of its genome can be characterized as euchromatin, S. cerevisiae has regions of DNA that are transcribed very poorly. These loci are the so-called silent mating type loci (HML and HMR), the rDNA (encoding ribosomal RNA), and the sub-telomeric regions. Fission yeast (Schizosaccharomyces pombe) uses another mechanism for heterochromatin formation at its centromeres. Gene silencing at this location depends on components of the RNAi pathway. Double-stranded RNA is believed to result in silencing of the region through a series of steps.

In the fission yeast Schizosaccharomyces pombe, two RNAi complexes, the RITS complex and the RNA-directed RNA polymerase complex (RDRC), are part of an RNAi machinery involved in the initiation, propagation and maintenance of heterochromatin assembly. These two complexes localize in a siRNA-dependent manner on chromosomes, at the site of heterochromatin assembly. RNA polymerase II synthesizes a transcript that serves as a platform to recruit RITS, RDRC and possibly other complexes required for heterochromatin assembly. Both RNAi and an exosome-dependent RNA degradation process contribute to heterochromatic gene silencing. These mechanisms of Schizosaccharomyces pombe may occur in other eukaryotes. A large RNA structure called RevCen has also been implicated in the production of siRNAs to mediate heterochromatin formation in some fission yeast.

== See also ==
- Centric heterochromatin
