= NCK1 =

Protein-coding gene in the species Homo sapiens

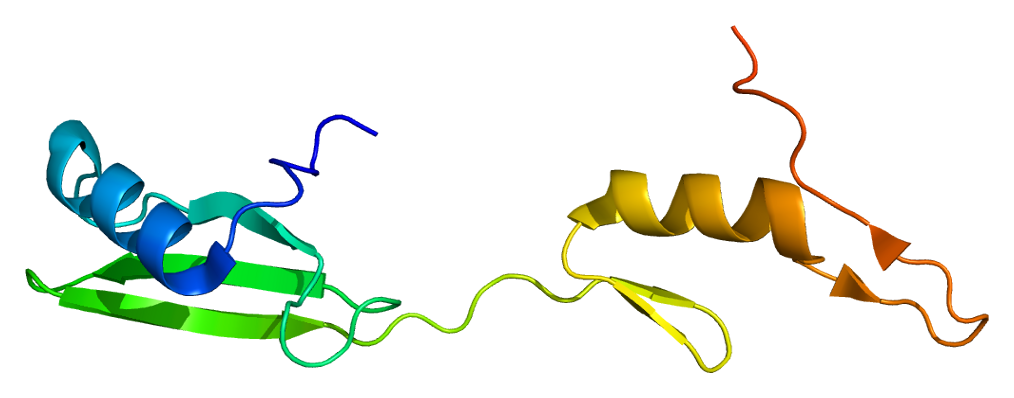

Identifiers
- Aliases: NCK1, NCK, NCKalpha, nck-1, NCK adaptor protein 1
- External IDs: OMIM: 600508; MGI: 109601; GeneCards: NCK1
Available structures
PDB	Ortholog search: PDBe RCSB
PDB	List of PDB id codes 2CI8, 2CI9, 2JS0, 2JS2, 2JW4

Gene location (Human)
Chr.	Chromosome 3 (human)
Band	3q22.3	Start	136,862,208 bp
Band	3q22.3	End	136,951,606 bp

Gene location (Mouse)
Chr.	Chromosome 9 (mouse)
Band	9|9 E3.3	Start	100,374,346 bp
Band	9|9 E3.3	End	100,428,187 bp
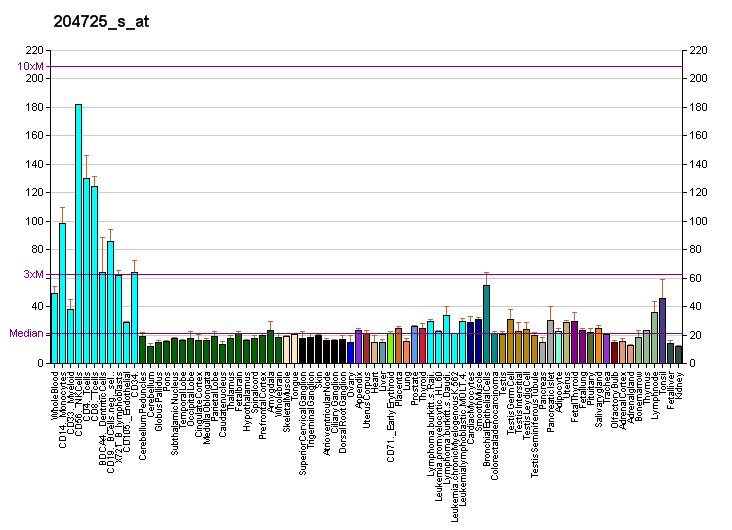

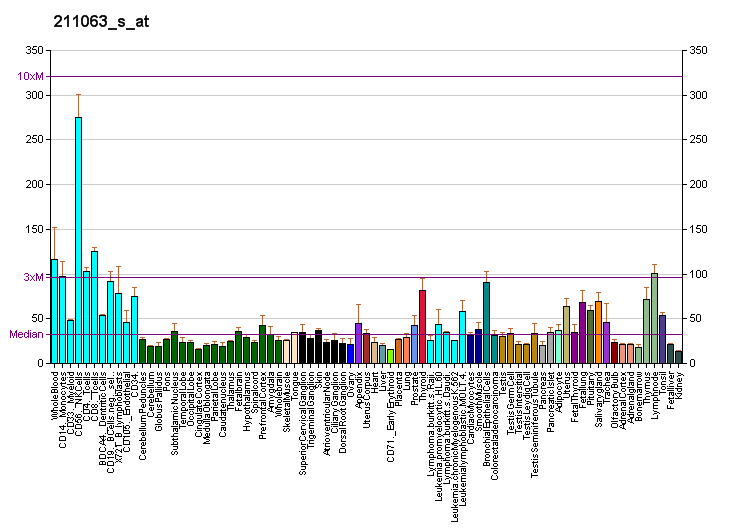
RNA expression pattern
Bgee	Human / Mouse (ortholog); Top expressed in: human penis; Achilles tendon; oral cavity; epithelium of nasopharynx; decidua; palpebral conjunctiva; tonsil; vagina; gums; skin of thigh / Top expressed in: granulocyte; atrioventricular valve; tail of embryo; esophagus; spermatocyte; masseter muscle; intercostal muscle; uterus; saccule; muscle of thigh; More reference expression data
BioGPS	More reference expression data
Gene ontology
Molecular function	protein-macromolecule adaptor activity; protein domain specific binding; receptor tyrosine kinase binding; protein kinase inhibitor activity; protein binding; cytoskeletal anchor activity; signaling receptor complex adaptor activity; signaling receptor binding; eukaryotic initiation factor eIF2 binding; ephrin receptor binding; cadherin binding; molecular adaptor activity
Cellular component	cytosol; ribosome; cell-cell junction; vesicle membrane; protein phosphatase type 1 complex; endoplasmic reticulum; nucleus; cytoplasm; plasma membrane
Biological process	positive regulation of endoplasmic reticulum stress-induced intrinsic apoptotic signaling pathway; Fc-gamma receptor signaling pathway involved in phagocytosis; actin filament organization; positive regulation of translation in response to endoplasmic reticulum stress; substrate-dependent cell migration, cell extension; signal complex assembly; negative regulation of cell death; positive regulation of cap-independent translational initiation; positive regulation of cap-dependent translational initiation; peptidyl-serine dephosphorylation; vascular endothelial growth factor receptor signaling pathway; response to other organism; positive regulation of T cell proliferation; negative regulation of peptidyl-serine phosphorylation; negative regulation of endoplasmic reticulum stress-induced eIF2 alpha phosphorylation; T cell receptor signaling pathway; negative regulation of PERK-mediated unfolded protein response; cell migration; negative regulation of transcription from RNA polymerase II promoter in response to endoplasmic reticulum stress; regulation of translation; T cell activation; lamellipodium assembly; positive regulation of transcription by RNA polymerase II; negative regulation of protein kinase activity; positive regulation of actin filament polymerization; regulation of cell migration; ephrin receptor signaling pathway; positive regulation of neuron projection development; negative regulation of insulin receptor signaling pathway
Sources:Amigo / QuickGO
Orthologs
Databases	NCBI: entry; OMA: entry
Species	Human	Mouse
Entrez	4690	17973
Ensembl	ENSG00000158092	ENSMUSG00000032475
UniProt	P16333	Q99M51
RefSeq (mRNA)	NM_006153; NM_001190796; NM_001291999	NM_010878; NM_001324530
RefSeq (protein)	NP_001177725; NP_001278928; NP_006144	NP_001311459; NP_035008
Location (UCSC)	Chr 3: 136.86 – 136.95 Mb	Chr 9: 100.37 – 100.43 Mb
PubMed search
- Wikidata
View/Edit Human	View/Edit Mouse

Cytoplasmic protein NCK1 is a protein that in humans is encoded by the NCK1 gene.

== Gene ==
The Nck (non-catalytic region of tyrosine kinase adaptor protein 1) belongs to the adaptor family of proteins. The nck gene was initially isolated from a human melanoma cDNA library using a monoclonal antibody produced against the human melanoma-associated antigen. The Nck family has two known members in human cells (Nck-1/Nckalpha and NcK2/NcKbeta), two in mouse cells (mNckalpha and mNckbeta/Grb4) and one in drosophila (Dock means dreadlocks-ortholog).

The two murine gene products exhibit 68% amino acid identity to one another, with most of the sequence variation being located to the linker regions between the SH3 and SH2 domains, and are 96% identical to their human counterparts. While human nck-1 gene has been localised to the 3q21 locus of chromosome 3, the nck-2 gene can be found on chromosome 2 at the 2q12 locus.

== Function ==
The protein encoded by this gene is one of the signaling and transforming proteins containing Src homology 2 and 3 (SH2 and SH3) domains. It is located in the cytoplasm and is an adaptor protein involved in transducing signals from receptor tyrosine kinases to downstream signal recipients such as RAS.

Nck1 has been linked to glucose tolerance and insulin signaling within certain tissues, namely the liver, in obese mice. A deletion of the protein also causes a decrease of ER stress signaling within these obese cells, which is normally increased by the excessive fat. This stress causes expression of the unfolded protein response pathway, which leads to a decrease in glucose tolerance and inactivation of insulin signaling in certain cell types. This renewed glucose tolerance and insulin signaling is caused by the inhibition of the unfolded protein response pathway, particularly the protein IRE1alpha, and its subsequent phosphorylation of IRS-1 that causes insulin signaling to be blocked. IRE1alpha is involved with the JNK pathway that is responsible for the phosphorylation of IRS-1. Nck1 regulates the activation of IRE1alpha within the pathway and when removed from the pathway disrupts activation. This means that Nck1 has an interaction with the UPR and that a deletion can cause a decrease in the stress pathway from the ER in the mice. These deficient, obese mice also show increased insulin-induced phosphorylation of PKB within the liver but do not possess the same expression in adipose tissues or skeletal muscles. This evidence points to the pathway being ER stress induced within liver tissue.

Nck1 has been shown to be associated with bone mass. A deficiency in Nck1, which is shown to reduce ER stress in obese mice, also accelerates unloading-induced osteoporosis caused by mechanical stress. This seems to suggest that would be a crucial protein involved with bone metabolism and that retention of bone tissue by a protein as yet unknown. Nck1 expression increased twofold when involved with neurectomy-based unloading osteoporosis. This then follows that in a deficient organism this upregulation would not be possible and thus the body would have increased bone loss due to the lack of expression of Nck1 to deal with the stress, which is what happens in vivo. This acceleration of bone loss leads researchers to believe that the pathway for bone metabolism is highly regulated by several proteins that have yet to be discovered or incorporated into a schema.

Nck1 is involved with cellular remodeling via the WASp/Arp2/3 complex to coordinate actin cytoskeletal remodeling. The WASp binds to the SH3 domains within the N-terminus of the protein and after Nck1 has been activated by the signal from the ligand binding to a receptor tyrosine kinase and then uses the WASp/Arp2/3 complex to reorganize the actin cytoskeleton and cause the polarization of the cell as well as promote directional migration via pseudopodia. The reorganization of this cytoskeleton is caused by different Rho GTPases being moved to different locations within the cell, primarily to the leading edge, and strengthening the bonds with extracellular matrix components to induce motion.

== Interactions ==
NCK1 has been shown to interact with:

- ABL1,
- CBL,
- DNM1,
- DAG1,
- EIF2B2,
- EPHB1,
- EGFR,
- KHDRBS1,
- LCP2,
- MAP4K1,
- MAP4K4,
- MINK1,
- NCKIPSD,
- NEDD9,
- PAK1,
- PDGFRB,
- PKN2,
- PTK2,
- RASA1,
- RICS,
- RRAS,
- SOCS7,
- SOS1,
- TBK1,
- WASL,
- WIPF1, and
- WAS.

== See also ==
- Signal transducing adaptor protein
- Receptor tyrosine kinase
- Ras superfamily
