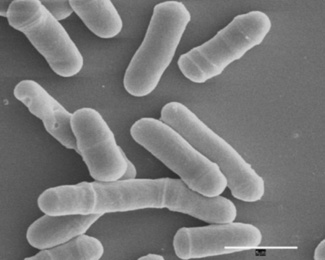
- Fission yeast culture (Schizosaccharomyces pombe)

Scientific classification
- Kingdom: Fungi
- Division: Ascomycota
- Subdivision: Taphrinomycotina
- Class: Schizosaccharomycetes; O.E. Erikss. & Winka 1997

Orders
- Schizosaccharomycetales

= Schizosaccharomycetes =

Class of fungi

The Schizosaccharomycetes are a monotypic class in the kingdom of fungi. It contains the order Schizosaccharomycetales which is its only order, the fission yeasts. The genus Schizosaccharomyces is a broad and ancient clade within Ascomycota including five known fission yeast: Schizosaccharomyces pombe, Schizosaccharomyces japonicius, Schizosaccharomyces octosporus, and Schizosaccharomyces cryophilus and Schizosaccharomyces osmophilus.
