= SOCS7 =

Protein-coding gene in the species Homo sapiens

Identifiers
- Aliases: SOCS7, NAP4, NCKAP4, suppressor of cytokine signaling 7
- External IDs: OMIM: 608788; MGI: 2651588; GeneCards: SOCS7

Gene location (Human)
Chr.	Chromosome 17 (human)
Band	17q12	Start	38,351,844 bp
Band	17q12	End	38,405,593 bp

Gene location (Mouse)
Chr.	Chromosome 11 (mouse)
Band	11|11 D	Start	97,253,261 bp
Band	11|11 D	End	97,289,368 bp
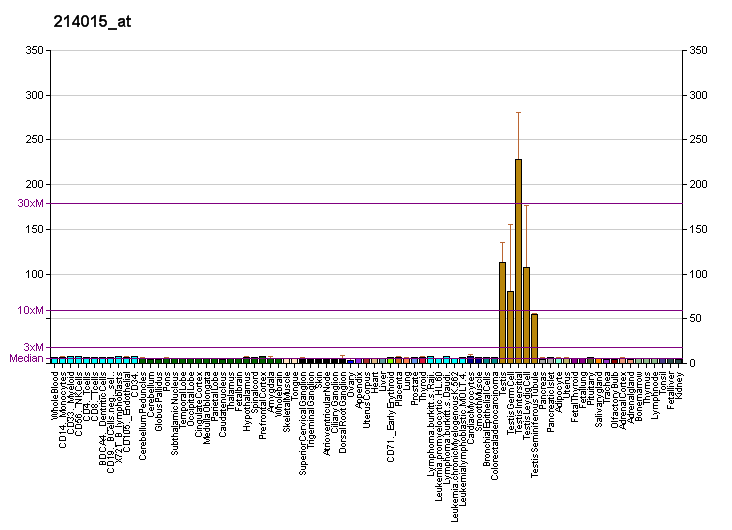
RNA expression pattern
Bgee	Human / Mouse (ortholog); Top expressed in: right testis; left testis; cerebellum; cerebellar cortex; cerebellar hemisphere; right hemisphere of cerebellum; ganglionic eminence; sural nerve; islet of Langerhans; skeletal muscle tissue / Top expressed in: seminiferous tubule; Rostral migratory stream; secondary oocyte; zygote; primary oocyte; neural layer of retina; cerebellar vermis; nucleus of stria terminalis; lobe of cerebellum; epithelium of lens; More reference expression data
BioGPS	More reference expression data
Gene ontology
Molecular function	SH3 domain binding; protein kinase inhibitor activity; protein binding; 1-phosphatidylinositol-3-kinase regulator activity
Cellular component	plasma membrane; membrane; nucleus; cytoplasm; cytosol; phosphatidylinositol 3-kinase complex
Biological process	insulin receptor signaling pathway; regulation of growth; negative regulation of signal transduction; intracellular signal transduction; cerebral cortex radially oriented cell migration; layer formation in cerebral cortex; fat cell differentiation; protein ubiquitination; negative regulation of protein kinase activity; cytokine-mediated signaling pathway; radial glia guided migration of Purkinje cell; negative regulation of receptor signaling pathway via JAK-STAT; biological process; regulation of phosphatidylinositol 3-kinase activity; phosphatidylinositol phosphate biosynthetic process
Sources:Amigo / QuickGO
Orthologs
Databases	NCBI: entry; OMA: entry
Species	Human	Mouse
Entrez	30837	192157
Ensembl	ENSG00000274229; ENSG00000274211	ENSMUSG00000038485
UniProt	O14512	Q8VHQ2
RefSeq (mRNA)	NM_014598	NM_138657
RefSeq (protein)	NP_055413	NP_619598
Location (UCSC)	Chr 17: 38.35 – 38.41 Mb	Chr 11: 97.25 – 97.29 Mb
PubMed search
- Wikidata
View/Edit Human	View/Edit Mouse

Suppressor of cytokine signaling 7 is a protein that in humans is encoded by the SOCS7 gene.

== Interactions ==
SOCS7 has been shown to interact with NCK1.
