= Septin-10 =

Protein-coding gene in the species Homo sapiens

SEPTIN10

Identifiers
- Aliases: SEPTIN10, septin 10, SEPT10
- External IDs: OMIM: 611737; MGI: 1918110; GeneCards: SEPTIN10

Gene location (Human)
Chr.	Chromosome 2 (human)
Band	2q13	Start	109,542,799 bp
Band	2q13	End	109,614,143 bp

Gene location (Mouse)
Chr.	Chromosome 10 (mouse)
Band	10|10 B4	Start	59,141,627 bp
Band	10|10 B4	End	59,221,847 bp
RNA expression pattern
Bgee	Human / Mouse (ortholog); Top expressed in: skin of hip; skin of thigh; oral cavity; skin of arm; germinal epithelium; human penis; Epithelium of choroid plexus; hair follicle; amniotic fluid; parietal pleura / Top expressed in: spermatocyte; spermatid; atrioventricular valve; endocardial cushion; seminiferous tubule; genital tubercle; corneal stroma; cardiac muscle tissue of left ventricle; ventricular zone; tail of embryo; More reference expression data
BioGPS	n/a
Gene ontology
Molecular function	nucleotide binding; GTP binding; protein binding; GTPase activity; molecular adaptor activity
Cellular component	cytoplasm; cytoskeleton; septin ring; microtubule cytoskeleton; septin complex; septin filament array
Biological process	cell cycle; cell division; mitotic cytokinesis; septin ring assembly; cilium assembly; cytoskeleton-dependent cytokinesis
Sources:Amigo / QuickGO
Orthologs
Databases	NCBI: entry; OMA: entry
Species	Human	Mouse
Entrez	151011	103080
Ensembl	ENSG00000186522	ENSMUSG00000019917
UniProt	Q9P0V9	Q8C650
RefSeq (mRNA)	NM_144710; NM_178584; NM_001321496; NM_001321498; NM_001321499 NM_001321500; NM_001321501; NM_001321502; NM_001321503; NM_001321504; NM_001321505; NM_001321506; NM_001321507; NM_001321508; NM_001321509; NM_001321510; NM_001321511; NM_001321512; NM_001321513; NM_001321514; NM_001321515	NM_001024910; NM_001024911
RefSeq (protein)	NP_001308425; NP_001308427; NP_001308428; NP_001308429; NP_001308430 NP_001308431; NP_001308432; NP_001308433; NP_001308434; NP_001308435; NP_001308436; NP_001308437; NP_001308438; NP_001308439; NP_001308440; NP_001308441; NP_001308442; NP_001308443; NP_001308444; NP_653311; NP_848699; NP_001308427.1	NP_001020081; NP_001020082; NP_001365992; NP_001365993; NP_001365994 NP_001365995
Location (UCSC)	Chr 2: 109.54 – 109.61 Mb	Chr 10: 59.14 – 59.22 Mb
PubMed search
- Wikidata
View/Edit Human	View/Edit Mouse

Septin-10 is a protein that in humans is encoded by the SEPTIN10 gene (previously SEPT10).

== Function ==
This gene encodes a member of the septin family of cytoskeletal proteins with GTPase activity. This protein localizes to the cytoplasm and nucleus and displays GTP-binding and GTPase activity. Alternative splicing results in multiple transcript variants.
