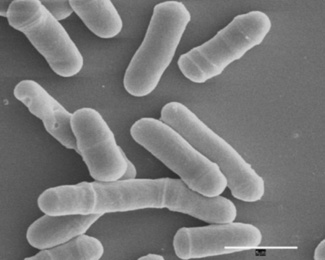
- Microscopic view of a fission yeast culture. Latina: Schizosaccharomyces pombe

Scientific classification
- Kingdom: Fungi
- Division: Ascomycota
- Class: Schizosaccharomycetes
- Order: Schizosaccharomycetales; O.E. Erikss., Svedskog & Landvik, 1993

Families
- Schizosaccharomycetaceae

= Schizosaccharomycetales =

Order of fungi

Schizosaccharomycetales is an monotypic order in the kingdom of fungi that contains only 1 family being Schizosaccharomycetaceae.
