= Septin =

Family of proteins

Cell division/GTP binding protein

Identifiers
- Symbol: Cell_Div_GTP_bd
- Pfam: PF00735
- Pfam clan: CL0023
- InterPro: IPR000038
Available protein structures:
- PDB: IPR000038 PF00735 (ECOD; PDBsum)
- AlphaFold: IPR000038; PF00735

Septins are a group of GTP-binding proteins expressed in all eukaryotic cells except plants. Different septins form protein complexes with each other. These complexes can further assemble into filaments, rings and gauzes. Assembled as such, septins function in cells by localizing other proteins, either by providing a scaffold to which proteins can attach, or by forming a barrier preventing the diffusion of molecules from one compartment of the cell to another, or in the cell cortex as a barrier to the diffusion of membrane-bound proteins.

Septins have been implicated in the localization of cellular processes at the site of cell division, and at the cell membrane at sites where specialized structures like cilia or flagella are attached to the cell body. In yeast cells, they compartmentalize parts of the cell and build scaffolding to provide structural support during cell division at the septum, from which they derive their name. Research in human cells suggests that septins build cages around pathogenic bacteria, that immobilize and prevent them from invading other cells.

As filament forming proteins, septins can be considered part of the cytoskeleton. Apart from forming non-polar filaments, septins associate with cell membranes, the cell cortex, actin filaments and microtubules.

== Structure ==
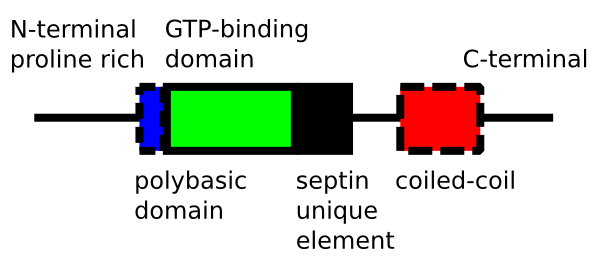
schematic domain structure of septin polypeptide chain

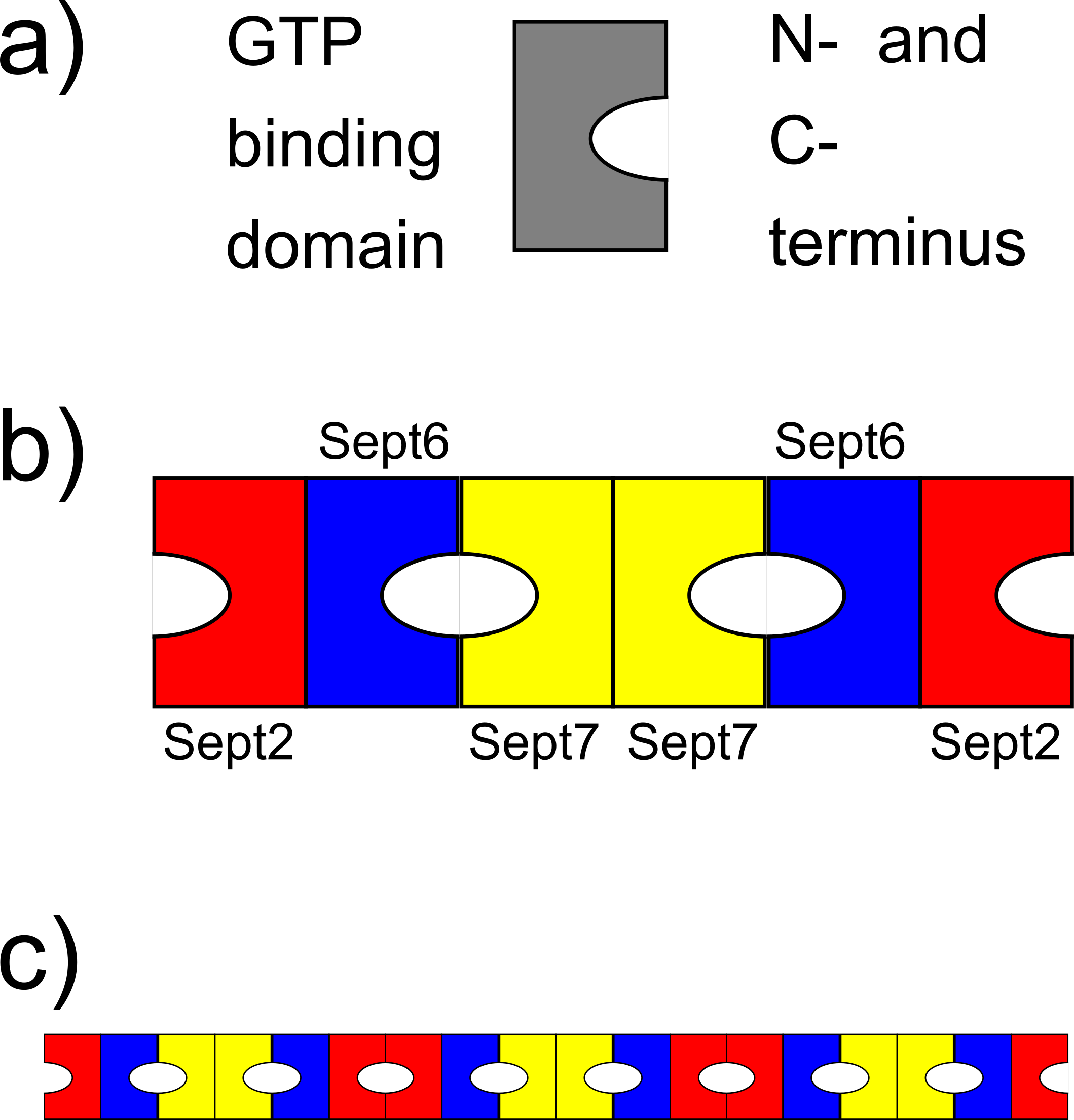
a) schematic of septin molecule with GTP binding domain to one side and the N and C termini of the polypeptide chain to the other b) schematic of septin heterohexameric complex (of human septins), where different septins bind to each other via their GTP binding domains or via the N and C termini. Note the symmetry of the complex c) schematic how septin complexes could align to form septin filaments

Septins are P-Loop-NTPase proteins that range in weight from 30-65 kDa. Septins are highly conserved between different eukaryotic species. They are composed of a variable-length proline rich N-terminus with a basic phosphoinositide binding motif important for membrane association, a GTP-binding domain, a highly conserved Septin Unique Element domain, and a C-terminal extension including a coiled coil domain of varying length.

Septins interact either via their respective GTP-binding domains, or via both their N- and C-termini. Different organisms express a different number of septins, and from those symmetric oligomers are formed. For example, in yeast the octameric complex formed is Cdc11-Cdc12-Cdc3-Cdc10-Cdc10-Cdc3-Cdc12-Cdc11. In humans, hexameric or octameric complexes are possible. Initially, it was indicated that the human complex was Sept7-Sept6-Sept2-Sept2-Sept6-Sept7; but recently this order has been revised to Sept2-Sept6-Sept7-Sept7-Sept6-Sept2 (or Sept2-Sept6-Sept7-Sept3-Sept3-Sept7-Sept6-Sept2 in case of octameric hetero-oligomers). These complexes then associate to form non-polar filaments, filament bundles, cages or ring structures in cells.

== Occurrence ==
Septins are found in fungi, animals, and some eukaryotic algae but are not found in plants.

Septin genes in different exemplar species
	Species	Group (phylogenetic)	Septin genes
Fungi	Saccharomyces cerevisiae	Cdc3	Cdc3
Fungi	Saccharomyces cerevisiae	Cdc10	Cdc10
Fungi	Saccharomyces cerevisiae	Cdc11	Cdc11, Shs1, Spr28
Fungi	Saccharomyces cerevisiae	Cdc12	Cdc12, Spr3
Fungi	Schizosaccharomyces pombe	Spn1	Spn1
Fungi	Schizosaccharomyces pombe	Spn2	Spn2
Fungi	Schizosaccharomyces pombe	Spn3	Spn3, Spn5, Spn7
Fungi	Schizosaccharomyces pombe	Spn4	Spn4, Spn6
Fungi	Candida albicans	Cdc3	Cdc3
Fungi	Candida albicans	Cdc10	Cdc10
Fungi	Candida albicans	Cdc11	Cdc11, Sep7, Spr28
Fungi	Candida albicans	Cdc12	Cdc12, Spr3
Fungi	Aspergillus nidulans	AspD	AspD
Fungi	Aspergillus nidulans	AspB	AspB
Fungi	Aspergillus nidulans	AspA	AspA
Fungi	Aspergillus nidulans	AspC	AspC
Fungi	Aspergillus nidulans	AspE	AspE
Animals	Humans	Sept2	Sept1, Spet2, Sept4, Sept5
Animals	Humans	Sept3	Sept3, Sept9, Sept12
Animals	Humans	Sept6	Sept6, Sept8, Sept10, Sept11, Sept14
Animals	Humans	Sept7	Sept7 (Sept13 as a pseudogene)
Animals	Caenorhabditis elegans	UNC-59	UNC-59
Animals	Caenorhabditis elegans	UNC-61	UNC-61

== In yeast ==
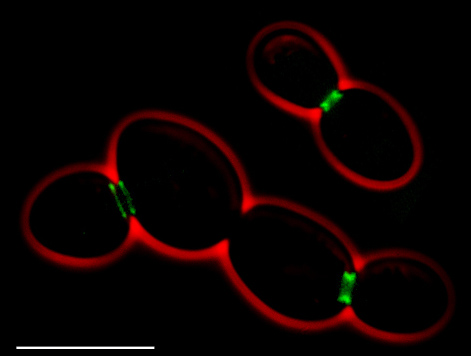
Septins in Saccharomyces cerevisiae (fluorescent micrograph) • Green: septins (AgSEP7-GFP) • Red: cell outline (phase contrast) • Scale bar: 10 μm

There are seven different septins in Saccharomyces cerevisiae. Five of those are involved in mitosis, while two (Spr3 and Spr28) are specific to sporulation. Mitotic septins (Cdc3, Cdc10, Cdc11, Cdc12, Shs1) form a ring structure at the bud neck during cell division. They are involved in the selection of the bud-site, the positioning of the mitotic spindle, polarized growth, and cytokinesis. The sporulating septins (Spr3, Spr28) localize together with Cdc3 and Cdc11 to the edges of prospore membranes.

=== Organization ===
Septins form a specialised region in the cell cortex known as the septin cortex. The septin cortex undergoes several changes throughout the cell cycle: The first visible septin structure is a distinct ring which appears ~15 min before bud emergence. After bud emergence, the ring broadens to assume the shape of an hourglass around the mother-bud neck. During cytokinesis, the septin cortex splits into a double ring which eventually disappears. How can the septin cortex undergo such dramatic changes, although some of its functions may require it to be a stable structure? FRAP analysis has revealed that the turnover of septins at the neck undergoes multiple changes during the cell cycle. The predominant, functional conformation is characterized by a low turnover rate (frozen state), during which the septins are phosphorylated. Structural changes require a destabilization of the septin cortex (fluid state) induced by dephosphorylation prior to bud emergence, ring splitting and cell separation.

The composition of the septin cortex does not only vary throughout the cell cycle but also along the mother-bud axis. This polarity of the septin network allows concentration of some proteins primarily to the mother side of the neck, some to the center and others to the bud site.

=== Functions ===
==== Scaffold ====
The septins act as a scaffold, recruiting many proteins. These protein complexes are involved in cytokinesis, chitin deposition, cell polarity, spore formation, in the morphogenesis checkpoint, spindle alignment checkpoint and bud site selection.

==== Cytokinesis ====
Budding yeast cytokinesis is driven through two septin dependent, redundant processes: recruitment and contraction of the actomyosin ring and formation of the septum by vesicle fusion with the plasma membrane. In contrast to septin mutants, disruption of one single pathway only leads to a delay in cytokinesis, not complete failure of cell division. Hence, the septins are predicted to act at the most upstream level of cytokinesis.

==== Cell polarity ====
After the isotropic-apical switch in budding yeast, cortical components, supposedly of the exocyst and polarisome, are delocalized from the apical pole to the entire plasma membrane of the bud, but not the mother cell. The septin ring at the neck serves as a cortical barrier that prevents membrane diffusion of these factors between the two compartments. This asymmetric distribution is abolished in septin mutants.

Some conditional septin mutants do not form buds at their normal axial location. Moreover, the typical localization of some bud-site-selection factors in a double ring at the neck is lost or disturbed in these mutants. This indicates that the septins may serve as anchoring site for such factors in axially budding cells.

== In filamentous fungi ==
Since their discovery in S. cerevisiae, septin homologues have been found in other eukaryotic species, including filamentous fungi. Septins in filamentous fungi display a variety of different shapes within single cells, where they control aspects of filamentous morphology.

=== Candida albicans ===
The genome of C. albicans encodes homologues to all S. cerevisiae septins. Without Cdc3 and Cdc12 genes Candida albicans cannot proliferate, other septins affect morphology and chitin deposition, but are not essential. Candida albicans can display different morphologies of vegetative growth, which determines the appearance of septin structures. Newly forming hyphae form a septin ring at the base, Double rings form at sites of hyphal septation, and a septin cap forms at hyphal tips. Elongated septin-filaments encircle the spherical chlamydospores. Double rings of septins at the septation site also bear growth polarity, with the growing tip ring disassembling, while the basal ring remaining intact.

=== Aspergillus nidulans ===
Five septins are found in A. nidulans (AnAspAp, AnAspBp, AnAspCp, AnAspDp, AnAspEp). AnAspBp forms single rings at septation sites that eventually split into double rings. Additionally, AnAspBp forms a ring at sites of branch emergence which broadens into a band as the branch grows. Like in C. albicans, double rings reflect polarity of the hypha. In the case of Aspergillus nidulans polarity is conveyed by disassembly of the more basal ring (the ring further away from the hyphal growth tip), leaving the apical ring intact, potentially as a growth guidance cue.

=== Ashbya gossypii ===
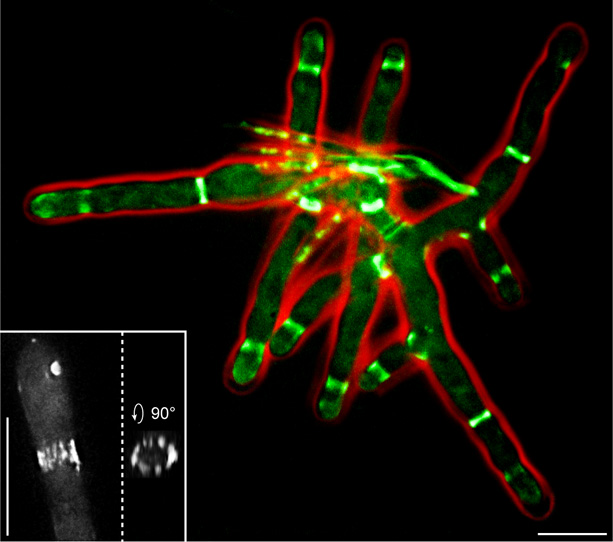
Septins in Ashbya gossypii (fluorescent micrograph) • Green: septins (AgSEP7-GFP) • Red: cell outline (phase contrast) • Inlay: 3D reconstruction of a discontinuous septin ring • Scale bars: 10 μm

The ascomycete A. gossypii possesses homologues to all S. cerevisiae septins, with one being duplicated (AgCDC3, AgCDC10, AgCDC11A, AgCDC11B, AgCDC12, AgSEP7). In vivo studies of AgSep7p-GFP have revealed that septins assemble into discontinuous hyphal rings close to growing tips and sites of branch formation, and into asymmetric structures at the base of branching points. Rings are made of filaments which are long and diffuse close to growing tips and short and compact further away from the tip. During septum formation, the septin ring splits into two to form a double ring. Agcdc3Δ, Agcdc10Δ and Agcdc12Δ deletion mutants display aberrant morphology and are defective for actin-ring formation, chitin-ring formation, and sporulation. Due to the lack of septa, septin deletion mutants are highly sensitive, and damage of a single hypha can result in complete lysis of a young mycelium.

== In animals ==
In contrast to septins in yeast, and in contrast to other cytoskeletal components of animals, septins do not form a continuous network in cells, but several dispersed ones in the cytoplasm of the cell cortex. These are integrated with actin bundles and microtubules. For example, the actin bundling protein anillin is required for correct spatial control of septin organization. In the sperm cells of mammals, septins form a stable ring called annulus in the tail. In mice (and potentially in humans, too), defective annulus formation leads to male infertility.

=== Human ===
In humans, septins are involved in cytokinesis, cilium formation and neurogenesis through the capability to recruit other proteins or serve as a diffusion barrier. There are 13 different human genes coding for septins. The septin proteins produced by these genes are grouped into four subfamilies each named after its founding member: (i) SEPT2 (SEPT1, SEPT4, SEPT5), (ii) SEPT3 (SEPT9, SEPT12), (iii) SEPT6 (SEPT8, SEPT10, SEPT11, SEPT14), and (iv) SEPT7. Septin protein complexes are assembled to form either hetero-hexamers (incorporating monomers selected from three different groups and the monomer from each group is present in two copies; 3 x 2 = 6) or hetero-octamers (monomers from four different groups, each monomer present in two copies; 4 x 2 = 8). These hetero-oligomers in turn form higher-order structures such as filaments and rings.

Septins form cage-like structures around bacterial pathogens, immobilizing harmful microbes and preventing them from invading healthy cells. This cellular defence system could potentially be exploited to create therapies for dysentery and other illnesses. For example, Shigella is a bacterium that causes lethal diarrhoea in humans. To propagate from cell to cell, Shigella bacteria develop actin-polymer 'tails', which propel the microbes and allow them to gain entry into neighbouring host cells. As part of the immune response, human cells produce a cell-signalling protein called TNF-α which trigger thick bundles of septin filaments to encircle the microbes within the infected host cell. Microbes that become trapped in these septin cages are broken down by autophagy. Disruptions in septins and mutations in the genes that code for them could be involved in causing leukaemia, colon cancer and neurodegenerative conditions such as Parkinson's disease and Alzheimer's disease. Potential therapies for these, as well as for bacterial conditions such as dysentery caused by Shigella, might bolster the body's immune system with drugs that mimic the behaviour of TNF-α and allow the septin cages to proliferate.

=== Caenorhabditis elegans ===
In the nematode worm Caenorhabditis elegans there are two genes coding for septins, and septin complexes contain the two different septins in a tetrameric UNC59-UNC61-UNC61-UNC59 complex. Septins in C.elegans concentrate at the cleavage furrow and the spindle midbody during cell division. Septins are also involved in cell migration and axon guidance in C.elegans.

== In mitochondria ==
The septin localized in the mitochondria is called mitochondrial septin (M-septin). It was identified as a CRMP/CRAM-interacting protein in the developing rat brain.

== History ==
The septins were discovered in 1970 by Leland H. Hartwell and colleagues in a screen for temperature-sensitive mutants affecting cell division (cdc mutants) in yeast (Saccharomyces cerevisiae). The screen revealed four mutants which prevented cytokinesis at restrictive temperature. The corresponding genes represent the four original septins, ScCDC3, ScCDC10, ScCDC11, and ScCDC12. Despite disrupted cytokinesis, the cells continued budding, DNA synthesis, and nuclear division, which resulted in large multinucleate cells with multiple, elongated buds. In 1976, analysis of electron micrographs revealed ~20 evenly spaced striations of 10-nm filaments around the mother-bud neck in wild-type but not in septin-mutant cells. Immunofluorescence studies revealed that the septin proteins colocalize into a septin ring at the neck. The localization of all four septins is disrupted in conditional Sccdc3 and Sccdc12 mutants, indicating interdependence of the septin proteins. Strong support for this finding was provided by biochemical studies: The four original septins co-purified on affinity columns, together with a fifth septin protein, encoded by ScSEP7 or ScSHS1. Purified septins from budding yeast, Drosophila, Xenopus, and mammalian cells are able to self associate in vitro to form filaments. How the septins interact in vitro to form hetero-oligomers that assemble into filaments was studied in detail in S. cerevisiae.

Micrographs of purified filaments raised the possibility that the septins are organized in parallel to the mother-bud axis. The 10-nm striations seen on electron micrographs may be the result of lateral interaction between the filaments. Mutant strains lacking factors important for septin organization support this view. Instead of continuous rings, the septins form bars oriented along the mother-bud axis in deletion mutants of ScGIN4, ScNAP1 and ScCLA4.
