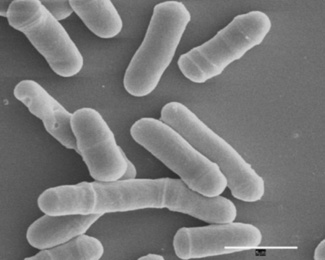
- Wild-type

Scientific classification
- Kingdom: Fungi
- Division: Ascomycota
- Class: Schizosaccharomycetes
- Order: Schizosaccharomycetales
- Family: Schizosaccharomycetaceae
- Genus: Schizosaccharomyces
- Species: S. pombe

Binomial name
- Schizosaccharomyces pombe Lindner (1893)

Synonyms
- Saccharomyces mellacei A.Jörg.; Saccharomyces pombe (Lindner) A.Jörg.; Schizosaccharomyces acidodevoratus Tschalenko; Schizosaccharomyces liquefaciens Osterw.; Schizosaccharomyces mellacei (A.Jörg.) Lindner; Schizosaccharomyces pombe var. acidodevoratus; Schizosaccharomyces pombe var. iotoensis Sakag. & Y.Otani; Schizosaccharomyces pombe var. ogasawaraensis Sakag. & Y.Otani

= Schizosaccharomyces pombe =

Species of yeast

Schizosaccharomyces pombe, also called "fission yeast", is a species of yeast used in traditional brewing and as a model organism in molecular and cell biology. It is a unicellular eukaryote, whose cells are rod-shaped. Cells typically measure 3 to 4 micrometres in diameter and 7 to 14 micrometres in length. Its genome, which is approximately 14.1 million base pairs, is estimated to contain 4,970 protein-coding genes and at least 450 non-coding RNAs.

These cells maintain their shape by growing exclusively through the cell tips and divide by medial fission to produce two daughter cells of equal size, which makes them a powerful tool in cell cycle research.

Fission yeast was isolated in 1893 by Paul Lindner from East African millet beer. The species name pombe is the Swahili word for beer. It was first developed as an experimental model in the 1950s: by Urs Leupold for studying genetics, and by Murdoch Mitchison for studying the cell cycle.

Paul Nurse, a fission yeast researcher, successfully merged the independent schools of fission yeast genetics and cell cycle research. Together with Lee Hartwell and Tim Hunt, Nurse won the 2001 Nobel Prize in Physiology or Medicine for work on cell cycle regulation.

The sequence of the S. pombe genome was published in 2002, by a consortium led by the Sanger Institute, becoming the sixth model eukaryotic organism whose genome has been fully sequenced. S. pombe researchers are supported by the PomBase MOD (model organism database). This has fully unlocked the power of this organism, with many genes orthologous to human genes identified — 70% to date, including many genes involved in human disease. In 2006, sub-cellular localization of almost all the proteins in S. pombe was published using green fluorescent protein as a molecular tag.

Schizosaccharomyces pombe has also become an important organism in studying the cellular responses to DNA damage and the process of DNA replication.

Approximately 160 natural strains of S. pombe have been isolated. These have been collected from a variety of locations including Europe, North and South America, and Asia. The majority of these strains have been collected from cultivated fruits such as apples and grapes, or from the various alcoholic beverages, such as Brazilian Cachaça. S. pombe is also known to be present in fermented tea, kombucha. It is not clear at present whether S. pombe is the major fermenter or a contaminant in such brews. The natural ecology of Schizosaccharomyces yeasts is not well-studied.

== History ==
Schizosaccharomyces pombe was first discovered in 1893 when a group working in a Brewery Association Laboratory in Germany was looking at sediment found in millet beer imported from East Africa that gave it an acidic taste. The term schizo, meaning "split" or "fission", had previously been used to describe other Schizosaccharomycetes. The addition of the word pombe was due to its isolation from East African beer, as pombe means "beer" in Swahili. The standard S. pombe strains were isolated by Urs Leupold in 1946 and 1947 from a culture that he obtained from the yeast collection in Delft, The Netherlands. It was deposited there by A. Osterwalder under the name S. pombe var. liquefaciens, after he isolated it in 1924 from French wine (most probably rancid) at the Federal Experimental Station of Vini- and Horticulture in Wädenswil, Switzerland. The culture used by Urs Leupold contained (besides others) cells with the mating types h90 (strain 968), h- (strain 972), and h+ (strain 975). Subsequent to this, there have been two large efforts to isolate S. pombe from fruit, nectar, or fermentations: one by Florenzano et al. in the vineyards of western Sicily, and the other by Gomes et al. (2002) in four regions of southeast Brazil.

== Ecology ==
The fission yeast S. pombe belongs to the division Ascomycota, which represents the largest and most diverse group of fungi. Free-living ascomycetes are commonly found in tree exudates, on plant roots and in surrounding soil, on ripe and rotting fruits, and in association with insect vectors that transport them between substrates. Many of these associations are symbiotic or saprophytic, although numerous ascomycetes (and their basidiomycete cousins) represent important plant pathogens that target myriad plant species, including commercial crops. Among the ascomycetous yeast genera, the fission yeast Schizosaccharomyces is unique because of the deposition of α-(1,3)-glucan or pseudonigeran in the cell wall in addition to the better known β-glucans and the virtual lack of chitin. Species of this genus also differ in mannan composition, which shows terminal d-galactose sugars in the side-chains of their mannans. S. pombe undergo aerobic fermentation in the presence of excess sugar. S. pombe can degrade L-malic acid, one of the dominant organic acids in wine, which makes them diverse among other Saccharomyces strains.

== Comparison with budding yeast (Saccharomyces cerevisiae) ==
The yeast species Schizosaccharomyces pombe and Saccharomyces cerevisiae are both extensively studied; these two species diverged approximately 300 to 600 million years before present, and are significant tools in molecular and cellular biology. Some of the technical discriminants between these two species are:

- S. cerevisiae has approximately 5,600 open reading frames; S. pombe has approximately 5,070 open reading frames.
- Despite similar gene numbers, S. cerevisiae has only about 250 introns, while S. pombe has nearly 5,000.
- S. cerevisiae has 16 chromosomes, S. pombe has 3.
- S. cerevisiae is often diploid while S. pombe is usually haploid.
- S. pombe has a shelterin-like telomere complex while S. cerevisiae does not.
- S. cerevisiae is in the G1 phase of the cell cycle for an extended period (as a consequence, G1-S transition is tightly controlled), while S. pombe remains in the G2 phase of the cell cycle for an extended period (as a consequence, G2-M transition is under tight control).
- Both species share genes with higher eukaryotes that they do not share with each other. S. pombe has RNAi machinery genes like those in vertebrates, while this is missing from S. cerevisiae. S. cerevisiae also has greatly simplified heterochromatin compared to S. pombe. Conversely, S. cerevisiae has well-developed peroxisomes, while S. pombe does not.
- S. cerevisiae has small point centromere of 125 bp, and sequence-defined replication origins of about the same size. On the converse, S. pombe has large, repetitive centromeres (40–100 kb) more similar to mammalian centromeres, and degenerate replication origins of at least 1kb.

== S. pombe pathways and cellular processes ==
S. pombe gene products (proteins and RNAs) participate in many cellular processes common across all life. The fission yeast GO slim provides a categorical high level overview of the biological role of all S. pombe gene products.

== Life cycle ==
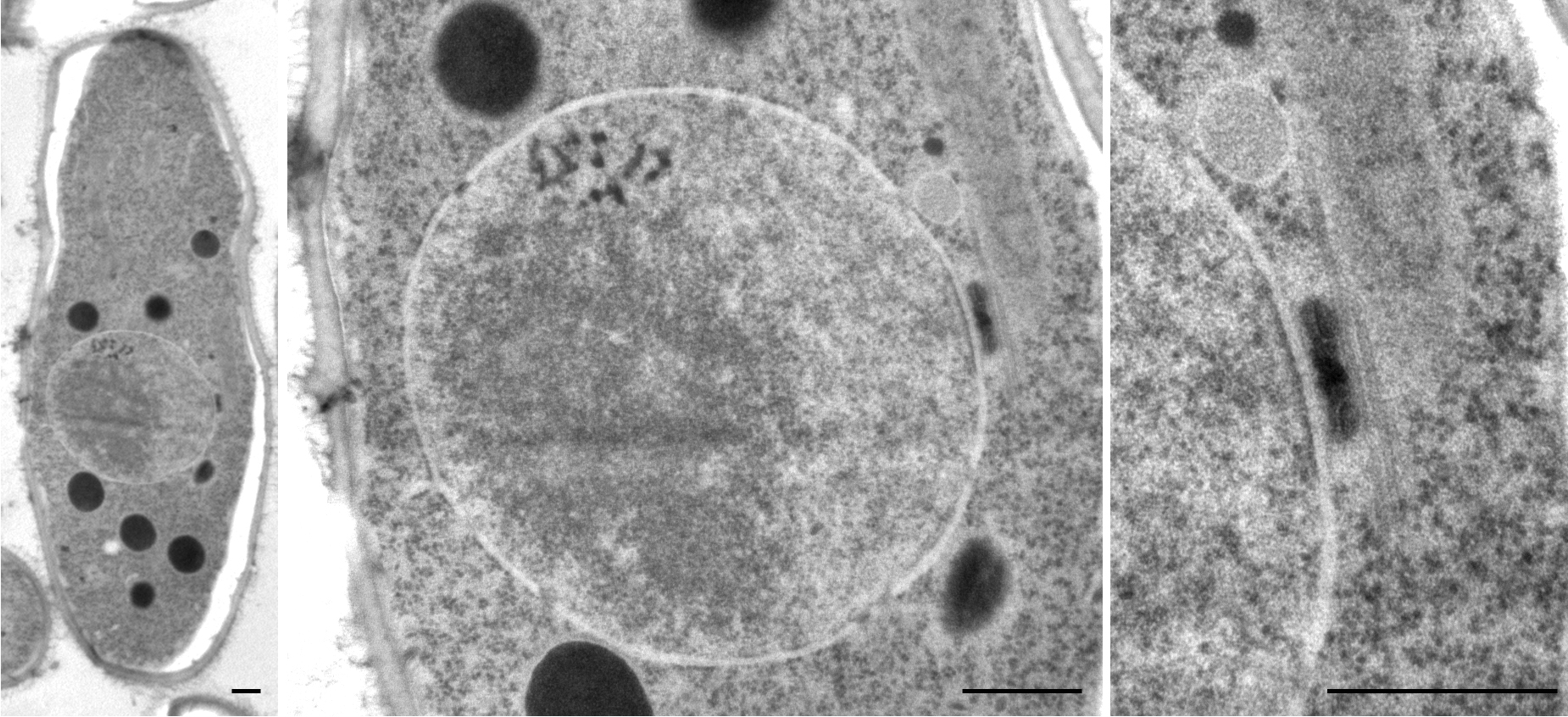
Centrosome of S. pombe.

The fission yeast is a single-celled fungus with simple, fully characterized genome and a rapid growth rate. It has long been used in brewing, baking, and molecular genetics. S. pombe is a rod-shaped cell, approximately 3 μm in diameter, that grows entirely by elongation at the ends. After mitosis, division occurs by the formation of a septum, or cell plate, that cleaves the cell at its midpoint.

The central events of cell reproduction are chromosome duplication, which takes place in S (Synthetic) phase, followed by chromosome segregation and nuclear division (mitosis) and cell division (cytokinesis), which are collectively called M (Mitotic) phase. G1 is the gap between M and S phases, and G2 is the gap between S and M phases. In the fission yeast, the G2 phase is particularly extended, and cytokinesis (daughter-cell segregation) does not happen until a new S (Synthetic) phase is launched.

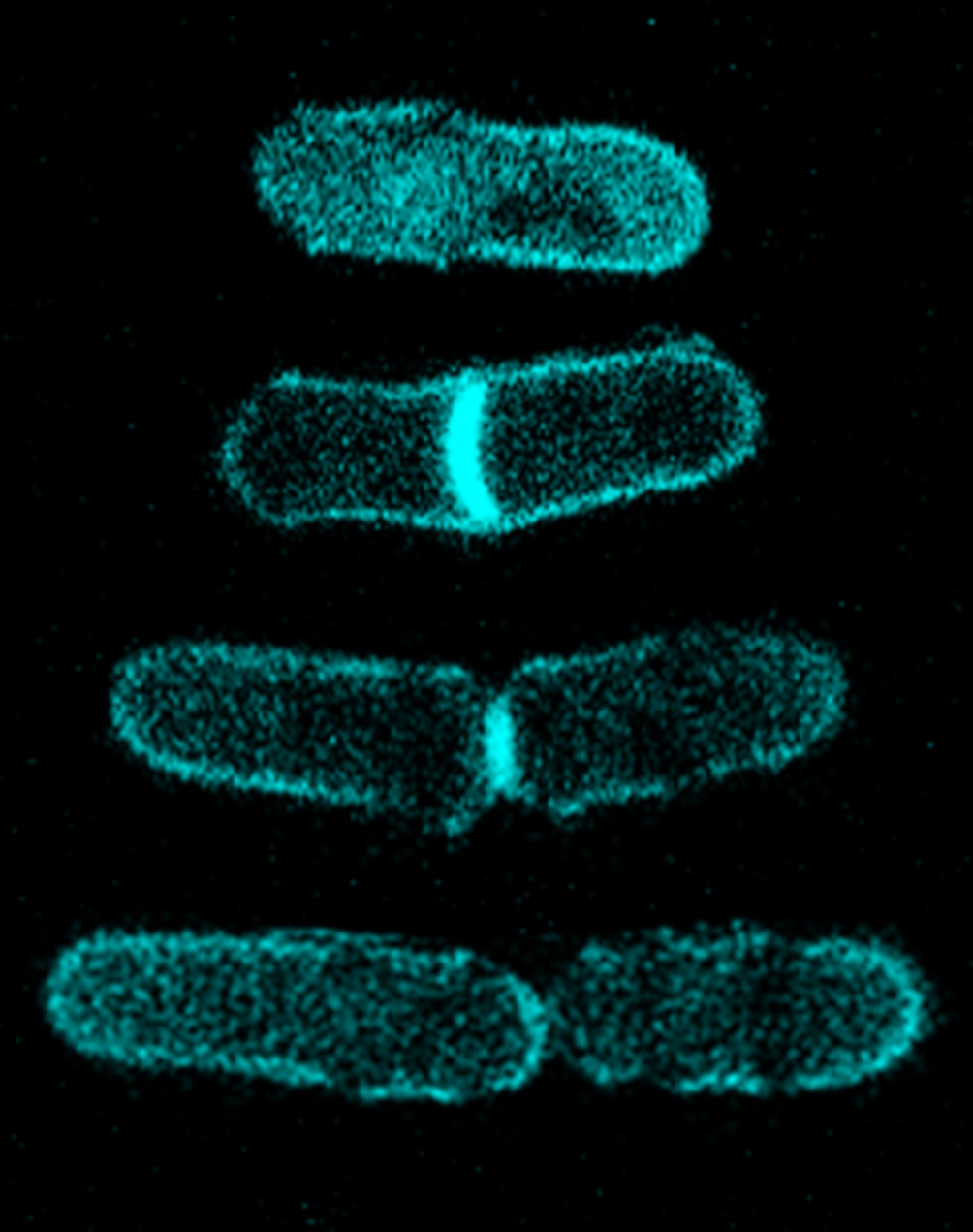
Calcofluor white confocal fluorescence image series demonstrating fission yeast division

Fission yeast governs mitosis by mechanisms that are similar to those in multicellular animals. It normally proliferates in a haploid state. When starved, cells of opposite mating types (P and M) fuse to form a diploid zygote that immediately enters meiosis to generate four haploid spores. When conditions improve, these spores germinate to produce proliferating haploid cells.

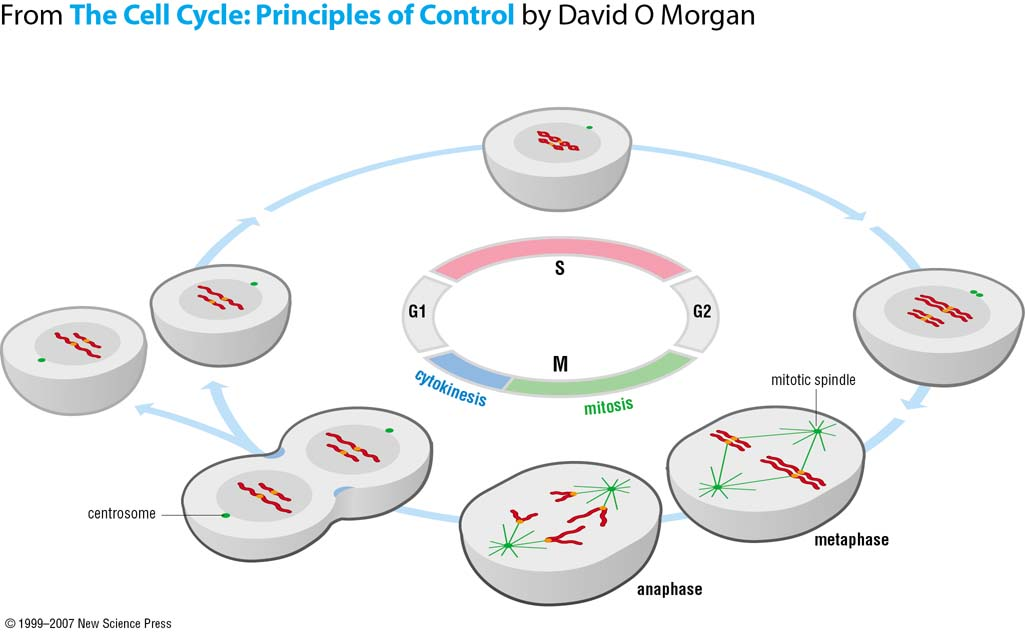
General features of the cell cycle.

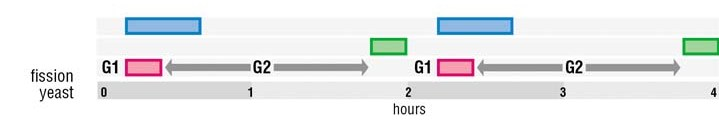
The particular cell cycle of a fission yeast.

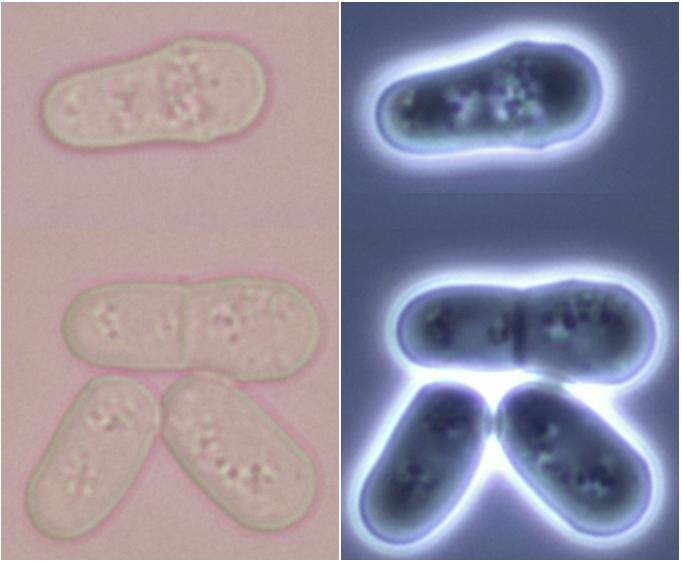
Division stages of Schizosaccharomyces in bright and dark field light microscopy

== Cytokinesis ==
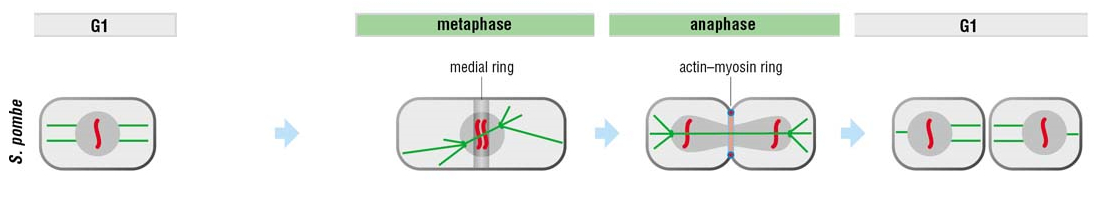
Cytokinesis of the fission yeast.

The general features of cytokinesis are shown here. The site of cell division is determined before anaphase. The anaphase spindle (in green on the figure) is then positioned so that the segregated chromosomes are on opposite sides of the predetermined cleavage plane.

== Size control ==
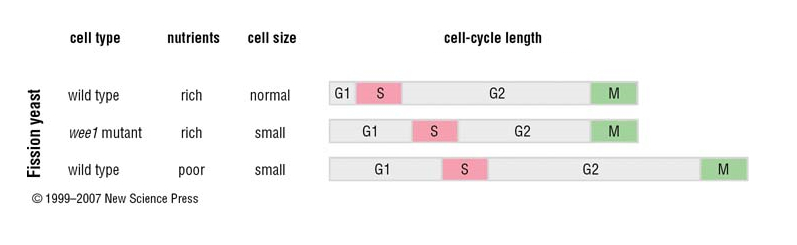
Cell-cycle length of the fission yeast depends on nutrient conditions.

In fission yeast, where growth governs progression through G2/M, a wee1 mutation causes entry into mitosis at an abnormally small size, resulting in a shorter G2. G1 is lengthened, suggesting that progression through Start (beginning of cell cycle) is responsive to growth when the G2/M control is lost. Furthermore, cells in poor nutrient conditions grow slowly and therefore take longer to double in size and divide. Low nutrient levels also reset the growth threshold so that cell progresses through the cell cycle at a smaller size. Upon exposure to stressful conditions [heat (40 °C) or the oxidizing agent hydrogen peroxide] S. pombe cells undergo aging as measured by increased cell division time and increased probability of cell death. Finally, wee1 mutant fission yeast cells are smaller than wild-type cells, but take just as long to go through the cell cycle. This is possible because small yeast cells grow slower, that is, their added total mass per unit time is smaller than that of normal cells.

A spatial gradient is thought to coordinate cell size and mitotic entry in fission yeast. The Pom1 protein kinase (green) is localized to the cell cortex, with the highest concentration at the cell tips. The cell-cycle regulators Cdr2, Cdr1 and Wee1 are present in cortical nodes in the middle of the cell (blue and red dots). a, In small cells, the Pom1 gradient reaches most of the cortical nodes (blue dots). Pom1 inhibits Cdr2, preventing Cdr2 and Cdr1 from inhibiting Wee1, and allowing Wee1 to phosphorylate Cdk1, thus inactivating cyclin-dependent kinase (CDK) activity and preventing entry into mitosis. b, In long cells, the Pom1 gradient does not reach the cortical nodes (red dots), and therefore Cdr2 and Cdr1 remain active in the nodes. Cdr2 and Cdr1 inhibit Wee1, preventing phosphorylation of Cdk1 and thereby leading to activation of CDK and mitotic entry. (This simplified diagram omits several other regulators of CDK activity.)

== Mating-type switching ==
Fission yeast switches mating type by a replication-coupled recombination event, which takes place during S phase of the cell cycle. Fission yeast uses intrinsic asymmetry of the DNA replication process to switch the mating type; it was the first system where the direction of replication was shown to be required for the change of the cell type. Studies of the mating-type switching system lead to a discovery and characterization of a site-specific replication termination site RTS1, a site-specific replication pause site MPS1, and a novel type of chromosomal imprint, marking one of the sister chromatids at the mating-type locus mat1. In addition, work on the silenced donor region has led to great advances in understanding formation and maintenance of heterochromatin.

== Responses to DNA damage ==
Schizosaccharomyces pombe is a facultative sexual microorganism that can undergo mating when nutrients are limiting. Exposure of S. pombe to hydrogen peroxide, an agent that causes oxidative stress leading to oxidative DNA damage, strongly induces mating and formation of meiotic spores. This finding suggests that meiosis, and particularly meiotic recombination, may be an adaptation for repairing DNA damage. Supporting this view is the finding that single base lesions of the type dU:dG in the DNA of S. pombe stimulate meiotic recombination. This recombination requires uracil-DNA glycosylase, an enzyme that removes uracil from the DNA backbone and initiates base excision repair. On the basis of this finding, it was proposed that base excision repair of either a uracil base, an abasic site, or a single-strand nick is sufficient to initiate recombination in S. pombe. Other experiments with S. pombe indicated that faulty processing of DNA replication intermediates, i.e. Okazaki fragments, causes DNA damages such as single-strand nicks or gaps, and that these stimulate meiotic recombination.

== As a model system ==
Fission yeast has become a notable model system to study basic principles of a cell that can be used to understand more complex organisms like mammals and in particular humans. This single cell eukaryote is nonpathogenic and easily grown and manipulated in the lab. Fission yeast contains one of the smallest numbers of genes of a known genome sequence for a eukaryote, and has only three chromosomes in its genome. Many of the genes responsible for cell division and cellular organization in fission yeast cell are also found in the human's genome. Cell cycle regulation and division are crucial for growth and development of any cell. Fission yeast's conserved genes has been heavily studied and the reason for many recent biomedical developments. Fission yeast is also a practical model system to observe cell division because fission yeast's are cylindrically shaped single celled eukaryotes that divide and reproduce by medial fission. This can easily be seen using microscopy. Fission yeast also have an extremely short generation time, 2 to 4 hours, which also makes it an easy model system to observe and grow in the laboratory. Fission yeast's simplicity in genomic structure yet similarities with mammalian genome, ease of ability to manipulate, and ability to be used for drug analysis is why fission yeast is making many contributions to biomedicine and cellular biology research, and a model system for genetic analysis.

=== Genome ===
Schizosaccharomyces pombe is often used to study cell division and growth because of conserved genomic regions also seen in humans including: heterochromatin proteins, large origins of replication, large centromeres, conserved cellular checkpoints, telomere function, gene splicing, and many other cellular processes. S. pombe's genome was fully sequenced in 2002, the sixth eukaryotic genome to be sequenced as part of the Genome Project. An estimated 4,979 genes were discovered within three chromosomes containing about 14Mb of DNA. This DNA is contained within 3 different chromosomes in the nucleus with gaps in the centromeric (40kb) and telomeric (260kb) regions. After the initial sequencing of the fission yeast's genome, other previous non-sequenced regions of the genes have been sequenced. Structural and functional analysis of these gene regions can be found on large scale fission yeast databases such as PomBase.

Forty-three percent of the genes in the Genome Project were found to contain introns in 4,739 genes. Fission yeast does not have as many duplicated genes compared to budding yeast, only containing 5%, making fission yeast a great model genome to observe and gives researchers the ability to create more functional research approaches. S. pombe's having a large number of introns gives opportunities for an increase of range of protein types produced from alternative splicing and genes that code for comparable genes in human. 81% of the three centromeres in fission yeast have been sequenced. The lengths of the three centromeres were found to be 34, 65, and 110 kb. This is 300–100 times longer than the centromeres of budding yeast. An extremely high level of conservation (97%) is also seen over 1,780-bp region in the DGS regions of the centromere. This elongation of centromeres and its conservative sequences makes fission yeast a practical model system to use to observe cell division and in humans because of their likeness.

PomBase reports over 70% of protein coding genes have human orthologs and over 1500 of these are associated with human disease . This makes S. pombe a great system to use to study human genes and disease pathways, especially cell cycle and DNA checkpoint systems.

The genome of S. pombe contains meiotic drivers and drive suppressors called wtf genes.

=== Genetic diversity ===
Biodiversity and evolutionary study of fission yeast was carried out on 161 strains of Schizosaccharomyces pombe collected from 20 countries. Modeling of the evolutionary rate showed that all strains derived from a common ancestor that has lived since ~2,300 years ago. The study also identified a set of 57 strains of fission yeast that each differed by ≥1,900 SNPs, and all detected 57 strains of fission yeast were prototrophic (able to grow on the same minimal medium as the reference strain). A number of studies on S.pombe genome support the idea that the genetic diversity of fission yeast strains is slightly less than budding yeast. Indeed, only limited variations of S.pombe occur in proliferation in different environments. In addition, the amount of phenotypic variation segregating in fission yeast is less than that seen, in S. cerevisiae. Since most strains of fission yeast were isolated from brewed beverages, there is no ecological or historical context to this dispersal.

=== Cell cycle analysis ===
DNA replication in yeast has been increasingly studied by many researchers. Further understanding of DNA replication, gene expression, and conserved mechanisms in yeast can provide researchers with information on how these systems operate in mammalian cells in general and human cells in particular. Other stages, such as cellular growth and aging, are also observed in yeast in order to understand these mechanisms in more complex systems.

S. pombe stationary phase cells undergo chronological aging due to production of reactive oxygen species that cause DNA damages. Most such damages can ordinarily be repaired by DNA base excision repair and nucleotide excision repair. Defects in these repair processes lead to reduced survival.

Cytokinesis is one of the components of cell division that is often observed in fission yeast. Well-conserved components of cytokinesis are observed in fission yeast and allow us to look at various genomic scenarios and pinpoint mutations. Cytokinesis is a permanent step and very crucial to the wellbeing of the cell. Contractile ring formation in particular is heavily studied by researchers using S. pombe as a model system. The contractile ring is highly conserved in both fission yeast and human cytokinesis. Mutations in cytokinesis can result in many malfunctions of the cell including cell death and development of cancerous cells. This is a complex process in human cell division, but in S. pombe simpler experiments can yield results that can then be applied for research in higher-order model systems such as humans.

One of the safety precautions that the cell takes to ensure precise cell division occurs is the cell-cycle checkpoint. These checkpoints ensure any mutagens are eliminated. This is done often by relay signals that stimulate ubiquitination of the targets and delay cytokinesis. Without mitotic check points such as these, mutagens are created and replicated, resulting in multitudes of cellular issues including cell death or tumorigenesis seen in cancerous cells. Paul Nurse, Leland Hartwell, and Tim Hunt were awarded the Nobel Prize in Physiology or Medicine in 2001. They discovered key conserved checkpoints that are crucial for a cell to divide properly. These findings have been linked to cancer and diseased cells and are a notable finding for biomedicine.

Researchers using fission yeast as a model system also look at organelle dynamics and responses and the possible correlations between yeast cells and mammalian cells. Mitochondria diseases, and various organelle systems such as the Golgi apparatus and endoplasmic reticulum, can be further understood, by observing fission yeast's chromosome dynamics and protein expression levels and regulation.

=== Virology ===
Because fundamental cellular pathways are conserved between fission yeast and humans, S. pombe has been developed as a surrogate host for genome-wide functional screening of viral proteins. In a process developeed by Zhao and colleagues, individual viral genes are expressed one at a time from an inducible promoter, allowing each protein's effect on yeast growth, cell-cycle progression, oxidative stress, and viability to be measured independently. Following the 2015–2016 Zika outbreak, this approach was applied to ZIKV proteins, seven of which were found to be cytopathic, with one causing cell hypertrophy and growth arrest mediated through the conserved target of rapamycin (TOR) pathway. The same screening platform has since been used to characterize other pathogens, including HIV-1 and SARS-CoV-2.

=== Meiotic recombination ===
RecA and RecA-like proteins are required for recombinational repair of DNA double-strand breaks. Five RecA-like proteins have been described in S. pombe that are linked to meiotic recombination, and all five RecA homologs appear to be required for normal levels of meiotic recombination.

=== Biomedical tool ===
However, there are limitations with using fission yeast as a model system: its multidrug resistance. "The MDR response involves overexpression of two types of drug efflux pumps, the ATP-binding cassette (ABC) family... and the major facilitator superfamily". Paul Nurse and some of his colleagues have recently created S. pombe strains sensitive to chemical inhibitors and common probes to see whether it is possible to use fission yeast as a model system of chemical drug research.

For example, Doxorubicin, a very common chemotherapeutic antibiotic, has many adverse side-effects. Researchers are looking for ways to further understand how doxorubicin works by observing the genes linked to resistance by using fission yeast as a model system. Links between doxorubicin adverse side-effects and chromosome metabolism and membrane transport were seen. Metabolic models for drug targeting are now being used in biotechnology, and further advances are expected in the future using the fission yeast model system.

=== Experimental approaches ===
Fission yeast is easily accessible, easily grown and manipulated to make mutants, and able to be maintained at either a haploid or diploid state. S. pombe is normally a haploid cell but, when put under stressful conditions, usually nitrogen deficiency, two cells will conjugate to form a diploid that later form four spores within a tetrad ascus. This process is easily visible and observable under any microscope and allows us to look at meiosis in a simpler model system to see how this phenomenon operates.

Virtually any genetics experiment or technique can, therefore, be applied to this model system such as: tetrad dissection, mutagens analysis, transformations, and microscopy techniques such as FRAP and FRET. New models, such as Tug-Of-War (gTOW), are also being used to analyze yeast robustness and observe gene expression. Making knock-in and knock-out genes is easy and with the fission yeast's genome being sequenced this task is well known.

== See also ==
- DNA damage (naturally occurring)
- DNA repair
- Yeast
- PomBase
