= Caulobacter inopinatus =

Scientific classification
- Domain: Bacteria
- Kingdom: Pseudomonadati
- Phylum: Pseudomonadota
- Class: Alphaproteobacteria
- Order: Caulobacterales
- Family: Caulobacteraceae
- Genus: Caulobacter
- Species: C. inopinatus

Binomial name
- Caulobacter inopinatus Onouye et al. 2025

Species of bacterium

Caulobacter inopinatus is a species in the family Caulobacteraceae. It is a Gram-negative, rod-shaped prokaryote that is microaerophilic and aerobic, originally found in O'ahu, Hawai'i.

== Taxonomy ==
Caulobacter inopinatus was determined to be a novel species from chemotaxonomic, genotypic, and phenotypic data retrieved from its distinct characteristics of its production of oxidase, its fatty acid types, and the guanine and cytosine information. Using the Sherlock Microbial Identification System, it was discovered that it contains the fatty acid 2-hydroxy octadecenoic acid, which other Caulobacters do not have. Common features it shares with other Caulobacter species include observable color, the use of enzyme catalase, and undetected enzyme amylase.

== Discovery ==
C. inopinatus was discovered by researchers and students at the University of Hawai'i at Manoa during a marine microbiology course. In this class, undergraduate students practiced lab techniques by collecting seawater samples and culturing bacteria to study their characteristics. Seawater was collected on Jan. 13, 2019 from shallow water at Kawaiku'i Beach Park on O'ahu, Hawai'i. Samples were filtered and grown on Reasoner's 2A agar (R2A agar) to allow bacterial colonies to develop. Among several colonies that formed, one colony appeared different in size, which led researchers to isolate now-labeled strain 73WT. By sequencing part of its 16S ribosomal ribonucleic acid (16S rRNA) gene, Onouye et al. found that the bacterium was closely related to species in the genus Caulobacter, with about 97.3-97.9% similarity to known species. Microscopic observations revealed that it had features like curved rod-shaped cells, stalked cells, and single polar flagellum, similar to C. crescentus. Additional genomic analysis, including average nucleotide identity (ANI) and digital DNA-DNA hybridization (dDDH) comparisons, further supported that it was different enough to be classified as a new species. Scientists attempted to replicate the seawater salt concentration environment but found that the species could not survive, suggesting that it likely originated from soil or freshwater environments and was transported into the ocean through submarine groundwater discharge (SGD). Because the bacterium was found in such an unexpected location, it was named C. inopinatus, from the Latin word inopinatus meaning "unexpected".

== Morphology ==
C. inopinatus is a gram-negative, rod-shaped cell that measures around 0.6–0.7×1.2–1.8 µm. The C. inopinatus grew on R2A agar, and after incubating overnight at 30 °C, the colonies were approximately 1 mm in diameter and colored yellow, which is consistent with other caulobacter species. Further, from the colonies on the agar, the texture was shiny, the elevation was convex, and the margins were entire. Using transmission electron microscopy (TEM), flagella were observed at the poles, and a prosthecate was present. In other Caulobacter species, a prosthecate has allowed for greater nutrient intake, especially in nutrient-limited environments.

== Classification and physiology ==
C. inopinatus was found in shallow seawater in Hawai'i but is not classified as a marine bacteria. Instead, it is classified as originating from a terrestrial ecosystem. It is likely the bacteria were forced into the ocean by outflow of groundwater, which was proposed due to its ability to only grow in concentrations of sodium chloride below 2.5%.

C. inopinatus strain 73W^{T} was grown on R2A agar plates to produce results to interpret physiological traits. The bacteria contain both oxidase, meaning it performs aerobic respiration, and catalase, which is an enzyme that breaks down hydrogen peroxide. The presence of cytochrome c oxidases is typically found in proteobacteria and Gram-negative bacteria, such as C. inopinatus, which participates in reduction-oxidation reactions. It is also considered a heterotrophic bacterium, an organism that derives its food source and energy from other organisms. Due to the temperatures it can survive in it is most closely related to a mesophile. From scientific literature, a mesophile is an organism that can adapt to a wide range of temperatures, allowing it to thrive in many different living conditions. Due to its fairly recent discovery, the ecological and metabolic characteristics of C. inopinatus are to be further studied.

== Phylogeny ==
The creation of the phylogenomic tree for C. inopinatus uses 16s rRNA nucleotide, which was assembled and annotated using EDGE Bioinformatics, v2.4.1. Then, the Type (Strain) Genome Server (TYGS) was used to determine the similarities between genomes. Phylogenetic neighbors of the C. inopinatus were determined using the Nucleotide Basic Local Alignment Search Tool (BLASTn) from the 16S rRNA gene. Further, the maximum likelihood (ml) tree with midpoint rooting was the method to create the tree. The percent similarity of the neighbors is between 97.3 and 97.5, and its neighbors include Caulobacter segnis, Caulobacter rhizosphaerae, Caulobacter vibrioides, Caulobacter zeae, Caulobacter mirabilis, and Caulobacter endophyticus. Using the database BLASTn, the closest related species is Caulobacter rhizosphaerae (97.5%).

== Genomics ==
To annotate the C. inopinatus genome, an open source bioinformatics software called Prokaryotic Annotation (PROKKA) was used to identify genes and predict the functions of the encoded proteins by matching the outputs to known databases. After using the PROKKA annotation for protein sequence analysis, it was determined that C. inopinatus has the ability to uptake glucose, indicated by sodium-glucose cotransporters, and potassium influx by potassium, lithium, and rubidium/H+ antiporters. They also create and bring compatible solutes into the cell through multiple components. Onouye et al. found encoded products such as proline/betaine transporter proP and glutamine synthetase, which are typically found in halotolerant bacteria, or organisms capable of living in high-salinity environments. More specifically, ABC transporter permease and ATP-binding proteins common in halotolerant bacteria were present in the membrane. Despite these similar characteristics, Onouye et al. state that C. inopinatus is not considered native to the marine environment, as they were unable to grow in cultures modeled with seawater salt concentrations.

== Significance of discovery ==
People outside of microbiology should care about C. inopinatus because studying this organism may help scientists better understand how Hawai'i's land and ocean ecosystems are connected. Although this bacteria was discovered in seawater, it cannot grow in salt concentrations similar to normal seawater. This suggests that the microbe is not originally from the ocean, but rather from land or freshwater environments. Researchers believe it was transported into the ocean through underground seabeds. This discovery is important because it shows how microbes from land can move into marine environments and potentially influence coastal ecosystems. Studying organisms like C. inopinatus can therefore help scientists better understand how land-based processes affect coastal water quality and reef ecosystems in Hawai'i.
