= Brevundimonas abyssalis =

Scientific classification
- Domain: Bacteria
- Kingdom: Pseudomonadati
- Phylum: Pseudomonadota
- Class: Alphaproteobacteria
- Order: Caulobacterales
- Family: Caulobacteraceae
- Genus: Brevundimonas
- Species: B. abyssalis

Binomial name
- Brevundimonas abyssalis Tsubouchi et al. 2013

Type strain
- CECT 8073, CIP 110627, JCM 18150, TAR-001

Synonyms
- Brevundimonas psychrophilus

Species of bacterium

Brevundimonas abyssalis is a Gram-negative, alkali tolerant, psychrotolerant, aerobic, dimorphic prosthecate and heterotrophic bacterium from the genus Brevundimonas which has been isolated from deep-sea floor sediments from Japan.
