= Asticcacaulis taihuensis =

Scientific classification
- Domain: Bacteria
- Kingdom: Pseudomonadati
- Phylum: Pseudomonadota
- Class: Alphaproteobacteria
- Order: Caulobacterales
- Family: Caulobacteraceae
- Genus: Asticcacaulis
- Species: A. taihuensis

Binomial name
- Asticcacaulis taihuensis Liu et al. 2005

Type strain
- AS 1.3431, T3-B7, JCM 12463

Species of bacterium

Asticcacaulis taihuensis is a bacterium from the genus Asticcacaulis which has been isolated from sediments of the Taihu Lake in China.
