= Brevundimonas terrae =

Scientific classification
- Domain: Bacteria
- Kingdom: Pseudomonadati
- Phylum: Pseudomonadota
- Class: Alphaproteobacteria
- Order: Caulobacterales
- Family: Caulobacteraceae
- Genus: Brevundimonas
- Species: B. terrae

Binomial name
- Brevundimonas terrae Yoon et al. 2006

Type strain
- JCM 13476, KCTC 12481, KSL-145

Species of bacterium

Brevundimonas terrae is a Gram-negative and rod-shaped bacterium from the genus Brevundimonas which has been isolated from alkaline soil from Kwangchun in Korea.
