= Phenylobacterium deserti =

Scientific classification
- Domain: Bacteria
- Kingdom: Pseudomonadati
- Phylum: Pseudomonadota
- Class: Alphaproteobacteria
- Order: Caulobacterales
- Family: Caulobacteraceae
- Genus: Phenylobacterium
- Species: P. deserti

Binomial name
- Phenylobacterium deserti Khan et al. 2017

Type strain
- CCTCC AB 2016297, DSM 103871, NCCP-697, YIM 73061

Species of bacterium

Phenylobacterium deserti is a Gram negative, aerobic and motile bacterium from the genus of Phenylobacterium which has been isolated from desert soil from the Cholistan Desert in Pakistan.
