= Phenylobacterium panacis =

Scientific classification
- Domain: Bacteria
- Kingdom: Pseudomonadati
- Phylum: Pseudomonadota
- Class: Alphaproteobacteria
- Order: Caulobacterales
- Family: Caulobacteraceae
- Genus: Phenylobacterium
- Species: P. panacis

Binomial name
- Phenylobacterium panacis Farh et al. 2016Farh et al. 2016

Type strain
- JCM 31045, KCTC 42749, DCY 109

Species of bacterium

Phenylobacterium panacis is a Gram negative and rod-shaped bacterium from the genus of Phenylobacterium which has been isolated from the rhizosphere of a ginseng plant from the Hwacheon mountain in Korea.
