= Brevundimonas naejangsanensis =

Scientific classification
- Domain: Bacteria
- Kingdom: Pseudomonadati
- Phylum: Pseudomonadota
- Class: Alphaproteobacteria
- Order: Caulobacterales
- Family: Caulobacteraceae
- Genus: Brevundimonas
- Species: B. naejangsanensis

Binomial name
- Brevundimonas naejangsanensis Kang et al. 2009

Type strain
- CCUG 57609, DSM 23858, KCTC 22631, BIO-TAS2-2

Species of bacterium

Brevundimonas naejangsanensis is a Gram-negative, rod-shaped and motile bacterium from the genus Brevundimonas which has been isolated from soil from Korea.
