= Brevundimonas viscosa =

Scientific classification
- Domain: Bacteria
- Kingdom: Pseudomonadati
- Phylum: Pseudomonadota
- Class: Alphaproteobacteria
- Order: Caulobacterales
- Family: Caulobacteraceae
- Genus: Brevundimonas
- Species: B. viscosa

Binomial name
- Brevundimonas viscosa Wang et al. 2012

Type strain
- CGMCC 1.10683, JCM 17426, strain F3

Species of bacterium

Brevundimonas viscosa is a Gram-negative and rod-shaped bacterium from the genus Brevundimonas which has been isolated from saline soil from China.
