= Asticcacaulis solisilvae =

Scientific classification
- Domain: Bacteria
- Kingdom: Pseudomonadati
- Phylum: Pseudomonadota
- Class: Alphaproteobacteria
- Order: Caulobacterales
- Family: Caulobacteraceae
- Genus: Asticcacaulis
- Species: A. solisilvae

Binomial name
- Asticcacaulis solisilvae Kim et al. 2013

Type strain
- JCM 18544, KCTC 32102, AIM0088, CGM1-3EN

Species of bacterium

Asticcacaulis solisilvae is a Gram-negative, obligately aerobic, chemoheterotrophic and motile bacterium from the genus Asticcacaulis which has been isolated from forest soil from the Cheonggyesan Mountain in Korea.
