= Brevundimonas albigilva =

Scientific classification
- Domain: Bacteria
- Kingdom: Pseudomonadati
- Phylum: Pseudomonadota
- Class: Alphaproteobacteria
- Order: Caulobacterales
- Family: Caulobacteraceae
- Genus: Brevundimonas
- Species: B. albigilva

Binomial name
- Brevundimonas albigilva Pham et al. 2016

Type strain
- NHI-13, JCM 30385, KACC 18249

Synonyms
- Brevundimonas thaonhiensis

Species of bacterium

Brevundimonas albigilva is a Gram-negative, aerobic and short rod-shaped bacterium from the genus Brevundimonas which has been isolated from forest soil from the Kyonggi University in Korea.
