= Brevundimonas kwangchunensis =

Scientific classification
- Domain: Bacteria
- Kingdom: Pseudomonadati
- Phylum: Pseudomonadota
- Class: Alphaproteobacteria
- Order: Caulobacterales
- Family: Caulobacteraceae
- Genus: Brevundimonas
- Species: B. kwangchunensis

Binomial name
- Brevundimonas kwangchunensis Yoon et al. 2006

Type strain
- CIP 109906, DSM 17033, KCTC 12380, KSL-102

Species of bacterium

Brevundimonas kwangchunensis is a Gram-negative and rod-shaped bacterium from the genus Brevundimonas which has been isolated from alkaline soil in Korea.
