= Brevundimonas basaltis =

Scientific classification
- Domain: Bacteria
- Kingdom: Pseudomonadati
- Phylum: Pseudomonadota
- Class: Alphaproteobacteria
- Order: Caulobacterales
- Family: Caulobacteraceae
- Genus: Brevundimonas
- Species: B. basaltis

Binomial name
- Brevundimonas basaltis Choi et al. 2010

Type strain
- JCM 15911, KCTC 22177, strain J22

Species of bacterium

Brevundimonas basaltis is a Gram-negative, aerobic, rod-shaped and motile bacterium from the genus Brevundimonas which has been isolated from black sand from Soesokkak in Korea.
