= Phenylobacterium muchangponense =

Scientific classification
- Domain: Bacteria
- Kingdom: Pseudomonadati
- Phylum: Pseudomonadota
- Class: Alphaproteobacteria
- Order: Caulobacterales
- Family: Caulobacteraceae
- Genus: Phenylobacterium
- Species: P. muchangponense

Binomial name
- Phenylobacterium muchangponense Oh and Roh 2012

Type strain
- A8, KACC 15042, LMG 25973

Synonyms
- Phenylobacterium muchangpoensis

Species of bacterium

Phenylobacterium muchangponense is a Gram negative, aerobic, rod-shaped and non-motile bacterium from the genus of Phenylobacterium which has been isolated from beach soil from Muchangpo in Korea.
