= Brevundimonas nasdae =

Scientific classification
- Domain: Bacteria
- Kingdom: Pseudomonadati
- Phylum: Pseudomonadota
- Class: Alphaproteobacteria
- Order: Caulobacterales
- Family: Caulobacteraceae
- Genus: Brevundimonas
- Species: B. nasdae

Binomial name
- Brevundimonas nasdae Li et al. 2004

Type strain
- CIP 108442, DSM 14572, GTC 1043, JCM 11415, KCTC 12493, VKM B-2540, VTT E-072696, W1-2B

Species of bacterium

Brevundimonas nasdae is a Gram-negative and aerobic bacterium from the genus Brevundimonas which has been isolated from condensation water from the Mir.
