= Brevundimonas humi =

Scientific classification
- Domain: Bacteria
- Kingdom: Pseudomonadati
- Phylum: Pseudomonadota
- Class: Alphaproteobacteria
- Order: Caulobacterales
- Family: Caulobacteraceae
- Genus: Brevundimonas
- Species: B. humi

Binomial name
- Brevundimonas humi Dahal and Kim 2018

Type strain
- KACC 19106, KEMB 9005-528, NBRC 112677

Species of bacterium

Brevundimonas humi is a Gram-negative, non-spore-forming, rod-shaped, aerobic and motile bacterium from the genus Brevundimonas which has been isolated from forest soil from the Kyonggi University in Korea.
