= Brevundimonas halotolerans =

Scientific classification
- Domain: Bacteria
- Kingdom: Pseudomonadati
- Phylum: Pseudomonadota
- Class: Alphaproteobacteria
- Order: Caulobacterales
- Family: Caulobacteraceae
- Genus: Brevundimonas
- Species: B. halotolerans

Binomial name
- Brevundimonas halotolerans Abraham et al. 2010

Type strain
- CCUG 58273, LMG 25346, MCS24, VKM B-2594

Species of bacterium

Brevundimonas halotolerans is a Gram-negative and bacteroid-shaped bacterium from the genus Brevundimonas which has been isolated from brackish water from the Carkeek Park in the United States.
