= Phenylobacterium terrae =

Scientific classification
- Domain: Bacteria
- Kingdom: Pseudomonadati
- Phylum: Pseudomonadota
- Class: Alphaproteobacteria
- Order: Caulobacterales
- Family: Caulobacteraceae
- Genus: Phenylobacterium
- Species: P. terrae

Binomial name
- Phenylobacterium terrae Khan et al. 2019

Type strain
- YIM 730227T, KCTC62324T, CGMCC 1.16326

Species of bacterium

Phenylobacterium terrae is a Gram negative, aerobic, non-spore-forming, rod-shaped and motile bacterium from the genus of Phenylobacterium which has been isolated from soil from Khyber Pakhtun Khwa in Pakistan.
