= Asticcacaulis endophyticus =

Scientific classification
- Domain: Bacteria
- Kingdom: Pseudomonadati
- Phylum: Pseudomonadota
- Class: Alphaproteobacteria
- Order: Caulobacterales
- Family: Caulobacteraceae
- Genus: Asticcacaulis
- Species: A. endophyticus

Binomial name
- Asticcacaulis endophyticus Zhu et al. 2014

Type strain
- CCTCC AB 2013012, KCTC 32296, LMG 27605, strain ZFGT-14

Species of bacterium

Asticcacaulis endophyticus is a Gram-negative, strictly aerobic, rod-shaped and motile bacterium from the genus Asticcacaulis which has been isolated from the roots of the plant Geum aleppicum from the Taibai Mountain in China.
