= Brevundimonas lenta =

Scientific classification
- Domain: Bacteria
- Kingdom: Pseudomonadati
- Phylum: Pseudomonadota
- Class: Alphaproteobacteria
- Order: Caulobacterales
- Family: Caulobacteraceae
- Genus: Brevundimonas
- Species: B. lenta

Binomial name
- Brevundimonas lenta Yoon et al. 2007

Type strain
- DS-18, DSM 23960, JCM 14602, KCTC 12871, VKM B-2542

Species of bacterium

Brevundimonas lenta is a Gram-negative and rod-shaped bacterium from the genus Brevundimonas which has been isolated from soil from Dokdo in Korea.
