= Brevundimonas aveniformis =

Scientific classification
- Domain: Bacteria
- Kingdom: Pseudomonadati
- Phylum: Pseudomonadota
- Class: Alphaproteobacteria
- Order: Caulobacterales
- Family: Caulobacteraceae
- Genus: Brevundimonas
- Species: B. aveniformis

Binomial name
- Brevundimonas aveniformis Ryu et al. 2007

Species of bacterium

Brevundimonas aveniformis is a gram-negative, rod-like, stalk-producing bacterium belonging to the genus Brevundimonas.
