= Phenylobacterium lituiforme =

Scientific classification
- Domain: Bacteria
- Kingdom: Pseudomonadati
- Phylum: Pseudomonadota
- Class: Alphaproteobacteria
- Order: Caulobacterales
- Family: Caulobacteraceae
- Genus: Phenylobacterium
- Species: P. lituiforme

Binomial name
- Phenylobacterium lituiforme Kanso and Patel 2004

Type strain
- ATCC BAA-294, DSM 14363, FaiI3

Species of bacterium

Phenylobacterium lituiforme is a moderately thermophilic, facultative anaerobic and motile bacterium from the genus of Phenylobacterium which has been isolated from the Great Artesian Basin from Queensland in Australia.
