= Asticcacaulis biprosthecum =

Scientific classification
- Domain: Bacteria
- Kingdom: Pseudomonadati
- Phylum: Pseudomonadota
- Class: Alphaproteobacteria
- Order: Caulobacterales
- Family: Caulobacteraceae
- Genus: Asticcacaulis
- Species: A. biprosthecum

Binomial name
- Asticcacaulis biprosthecum Poindexter 1964

Species of bacterium

Asticcacaulis biprosthecum is a stalked bacterial species phylogenetically closely related to the species Caulobacter crescentus. However, instead of a single polar organelle called the stalk, Asticcacaulis biprosthecum possesses two stalks that are laterally positioned along the cylindrical cell body. The ecological significance of this arrangement is unknown.
