= Phenylobacterium haematophilum =

Scientific classification
- Domain: Bacteria
- Kingdom: Pseudomonadati
- Phylum: Pseudomonadota
- Class: Alphaproteobacteria
- Order: Caulobacterales
- Family: Caulobacteraceae
- Genus: Phenylobacterium
- Species: P. haematophilum

Binomial name
- Phenylobacterium haematophilum Abraham et al. 2008

Type strain
- CCUG 26751, LMG 11050

Species of bacterium

Phenylobacterium haematophilum is a Gram negative, rod-shaped and non-spore-formin bacterium from the genus of Phenylobacterium which has been isolated from human blood from Gothenburg in Sweden.
