= Brevundimonas faecalis =

Scientific classification
- Domain: Bacteria
- Kingdom: Pseudomonadati
- Phylum: Pseudomonadota
- Class: Alphaproteobacteria
- Order: Caulobacterales
- Family: Caulobacteraceae
- Genus: Brevundimonas
- Species: B. faecalis

Binomial name
- Brevundimonas faecalis Scotta et al. 2012

Type strain
- CCUG 58127, CECT 7729, CS20.3

Species of bacterium

Brevundimonas faecalis is a bacterium from the genus Brevundimonas.
