= Brevundimonas mediterranea =

Scientific classification
- Domain: Bacteria
- Kingdom: Pseudomonadati
- Phylum: Pseudomonadota
- Class: Alphaproteobacteria
- Order: Caulobacterales
- Family: Caulobacteraceae
- Genus: Brevundimonas
- Species: B. mediterranea

Binomial name
- Brevundimonas mediterranea Fritz et al. 2005

Type strain
- CIP 107934, DSM 14878, KCTC 12441, LMG 21911, V4.BO.10, VTT E-072666

Species of bacterium

Brevundimonas mediterranea is a Gram-negative, rod-shaped and non-spore-forming bacterium from the genus Brevundimonas which has been isolated from seawater from the Mediterranean Sea in France.
