= Brevundimonas canariensis =

Scientific classification
- Domain: Bacteria
- Kingdom: Pseudomonadati
- Phylum: Pseudomonadota
- Class: Alphaproteobacteria
- Order: Caulobacterales
- Family: Caulobacteraceae
- Genus: Brevundimonas
- Species: B. canariensis

Binomial name
- Brevundimonas canariensis Menendez et al. 2017

Type strain
- GTAE24, CECT 9126, LMG 29500

Species of bacterium

Brevundimonas canariensis is a bacterium from the genus Brevundimonas which has been isolated from roots of the plant Triticum aestivum from the Canary Islands in Spain.
