= Phenylobacterium koreense =

Scientific classification
- Domain: Bacteria
- Kingdom: Pseudomonadati
- Phylum: Pseudomonadota
- Class: Alphaproteobacteria
- Order: Caulobacterales
- Family: Caulobacteraceae
- Genus: Phenylobacterium
- Species: P. koreense

Binomial name
- Phenylobacterium koreense Aslam et al. 2005

Type strain
- IAM 15119, JCM 21577, KCTC 12206, NBRC 102285

Species of bacterium

Phenylobacterium koreense is a Gram negative, non-spore-forming, rod-shaped and aerobic bacterium from the genus of Phenylobacterium which has been isolated from activated sludge from a wastewater treatment plant from Daejeon in Korea.
