= 2026 Tunku Putra International School attack =

2026 crime in Malaysia

- The moment before the alleged perpetrator swung the axe at a teacher
- Location: 1°30′34″N 110°23′50″E; Tunku Putra-HELP International School, Kuching, Sarawak, Malaysia
- Date: October 21, 2026; 7:50 a.m. (MST; UTC+08:00)
- Target: School teacher, students
- Attack type: School attack
- Weapons: Hatchet; Fireworks; Penknife (unused)
- Deaths: 0
- Injuries: 1
- Perpetrator: Unnamed 16-year-old student
- Motive: Under investigation

The Tunku Putra International School attack was a violent attack that occurred at the Tunku Putra-Help International School in Kuching, the capital of the Malaysian state of Sarawak, Malaysia on October 21, 2026.

At approximately 7:50 a.m. on October 21, 2026, the perpetrator, a 16-year-old boy, struck a teacher with an axe inside a classroom. The teacher sustained minor injuries. The teenager was then disarmed by two students and apprehended by the police before being released on bail.

== Attack ==
Minutes before entering the classroom, the teenager had started a livestream on Facebook, initially in the institution's bathroom, using his device which was strapped to his head giving a first-person perspective of the attack.

Before livestreaming the attack, he had brought a hatchet, a lighter, firecrackers and other accessories in the school.

After gearing up, the suspect then left the bathroom and proceeded toward a classroom with his weapons. Upon opening the classroom door, the suspect proceeds to shout "This is what you get!", before striking the teacher with his hatchet.

The suspect then ran out of the classroom. While doing so, the phone fell out and dropped to the ground, causing the livestream to go dark, with only the audio being heard for the rest of the duration. He quickly returned through a second door at the back of the room and chased the remaining students, who evacuated the classroom.

After failing to strike any students, the suspect attempted to strike the teacher again but was immobilized by a student inside the classroom. Another student then entered the room and disarmed him. The suspect was restrained and sent to the Principal's Office until the arrival of the Kuching police authorities.

Due to his condition, the teenager was referred for medical evaluation under police custody and was subsequently released while investigations proceed under the laws of assault with a dangerous weapon and explosives law (due to possession of fireworks during the attack).

The police received the first call at around 8:03 am.

== Suspect ==
The teenage suspect was detained and later identified as a 16-year-old fourth-year secondary school student at the same institution.

Before the attack he had posted messages of despair on Facebook, where he expressed feelings of loneliness, social isolation and alienation. Authorities stressed that these online posts served as warnings that should not have been ignored.

== Victim ==
Only the teacher, whose identity was not disclosed, was hit, and she was slightly injured in the hands due to the hatchet attacks.
