= Asticcacaulis benevestitus =

Scientific classification
- Domain: Bacteria
- Kingdom: Pseudomonadati
- Phylum: Pseudomonadota
- Class: Alphaproteobacteria
- Order: Caulobacterales
- Family: Caulobacteraceae
- Genus: Asticcacaulis
- Species: A. benevestitus

Binomial name
- Asticcacaulis benevestitus Vasilyeva et al. 2006

Type strain
- ATCC BAA-896, DSM 16100, strain Z-0023

Synonyms
- Asticcacaulis benevestidus

Species of bacterium

Asticcacaulis benevestitus is a Gram-negative, aerobic, heterotrophic and psychrotolerant bacterium from the genus Asticcacaulis which has been isolated from shrub tundra wetland from the Polar Urals in Russia.Parker, Charles Thomas; Garrity, George M (2008-08-01). Parker, Charles Thomas; Garrity, George M (eds.). "Taxonomic Abstract for the species". NamesforLife Abstracts. NamesforLife, LLC. doi:10.1601/tx.10283.
