= Phenylobacterium kunshanense =

Scientific classification
- Domain: Bacteria
- Kingdom: Pseudomonadati
- Phylum: Pseudomonadota
- Class: Alphaproteobacteria
- Order: Caulobacterales
- Family: Caulobacteraceae
- Genus: Phenylobacterium
- Species: P. kunshanense

Binomial name
- Phenylobacterium kunshanense Chu et al. 2015

Type strain
- CCTCC AB 2013085, KCTC 42014, BUT-10

Synonyms
- Phenylobacterium kunshanensis

Species of bacterium

Phenylobacterium kunshanense is a Gram negative, aerobic and motile bacterium from the genus of Phenylobacterium which has been isolated from sludge from a factory for pesticide from Kunshan in China.
