= Phenylobacterium hankyongense =

Scientific classification
- Domain: Bacteria
- Kingdom: Pseudomonadati
- Phylum: Pseudomonadota
- Class: Alphaproteobacteria
- Order: Caulobacterales
- Family: Caulobacteraceae
- Genus: Phenylobacterium
- Species: P. hankyongense

Binomial name
- Phenylobacterium hankyongense Choi et al. 2018

Type strain
- KACC 18628, LMG 30081, HKS-05

Species of bacterium

Phenylobacterium hankyongense is a Gram negative, non-spore-forming, rod-shaped, aerobic and non-motile bacterium from the genus of Phenylobacterium which has been isolated from soil from a ginseng field.
