= Brevundimonas balnearis =

Scientific classification
- Domain: Bacteria
- Kingdom: Pseudomonadati
- Phylum: Pseudomonadota
- Class: Alphaproteobacteria
- Order: Caulobacterales
- Family: Caulobacteraceae
- Genus: Brevundimonas
- Species: B. balnearis

Binomial name
- Brevundimonas balnearis Toth et al. 2017

Type strain
- DSM 29841, NCAIM B.02621, FDRGB2b

Species of bacterium

Brevundimonas balnearis is a bacterium from the genus Brevundimonas which has been isolated from well water from the Gellért thermal bath in Hungary.
