= Cannula (disambiguation) =

Cannula, used alone or in combination with other words, has several meanings. It derives from the Latin "little reed"; and often refers to a tube.

== Biology ==
- Cannulae (archaea), hollow tubes found on the surface of some archaea, allowing them to establish contact with each other

== Medicine and Technology ==
Technology and medicine

- Cannula
  - Nasal cannula
  - Cannula transfer
  - Karman cannula
- Cannulated cow
- Cannulated screws (orthopedic implants)
- Cannula transfer or cannulation, a subset of air-free techniques used with a Schlenk line

== Zoology ==
- Cannula is a genus of straw-mimicking grasshoppers in the family Acrididae

== See also ==
- Cannuli (surname)
