= Phenylobacterium aquaticum =

Scientific classification
- Domain: Bacteria
- Kingdom: Pseudomonadati
- Phylum: Pseudomonadota
- Class: Alphaproteobacteria
- Order: Caulobacterales
- Family: Caulobacteraceae
- Genus: Phenylobacterium
- Species: P. aquaticum

Binomial name
- Phenylobacterium aquaticum (Jo et al. 2015)Jo et al. 2016

Type strain
- KACC 18306, LMG 28593

Synonyms
- Phenylobacterium aquaticus

Species of bacterium

Phenylobacterium aquaticum is a Gram negative, strictly aerobic, non-spore-forming and non-motile bacterium from the genus of Phenylobacterium which has been isolated from a reservoir of a water purifier.
