= Phenylobacterium conjunctum =

Scientific classification
- Domain: Bacteria
- Kingdom: Pseudomonadati
- Phylum: Pseudomonadota
- Class: Alphaproteobacteria
- Order: Caulobacterales
- Family: Caulobacteraceae
- Genus: Phenylobacterium
- Species: P. conjunctum

Binomial name
- Phenylobacterium conjunctum Abraham et al. 2008

Type strain
- CCUG 55074, FWC 21, LMG 24262

Species of bacterium

Phenylobacterium conjunctum is a Gram negative, rod-shaped and non-spore-forming bacterium from the genus of Phenylobacterium which has been isolated from water biofilm from Vancouver in Canada.
