= Phenylobacterium composti =

Scientific classification
- Domain: Bacteria
- Kingdom: Pseudomonadati
- Phylum: Pseudomonadota
- Class: Alphaproteobacteria
- Order: Caulobacterales
- Family: Caulobacteraceae
- Genus: Phenylobacterium
- Species: P. composti

Binomial name
- Phenylobacterium composti Weon et al. 2008

Type strain
- 4T-6, CIP 110190, DSM 19425, KACC 12597

Species of bacterium

Phenylobacterium composti is a Gram negative, strictly aerobic and motile bacterium from the genus of Phenylobacterium which has been isolated from cotton waste compost from Suwon in Korea.
