= Brevundimonas denitrificans =

Scientific classification
- Domain: Bacteria
- Kingdom: Pseudomonadati
- Phylum: Pseudomonadota
- Class: Alphaproteobacteria
- Order: Caulobacterales
- Family: Caulobacteraceae
- Genus: Brevundimonas
- Species: B. denitrificans

Binomial name
- Brevundimonas denitrificans Tsubouchi et al. 2014

Type strain
- CECT 8537, NBRC 110107, TAR-002

Species of bacterium

Brevundimonas denitrificans is a Gram-negative, aerobic, heterotrophic and denitrifying bacterium from the genus Brevundimonas which has been isolated from deep seafloor sediments from Japan.
