= Brevundimonas vancanneytii =

Scientific classification
- Domain: Bacteria
- Kingdom: Pseudomonadati
- Phylum: Pseudomonadota
- Class: Alphaproteobacteria
- Order: Caulobacterales
- Family: Caulobacteraceae
- Genus: Brevundimonas
- Species: B. vancanneytii

Binomial name
- Brevundimonas vancanneytii Estrela and Abraham 2010

Type strain
- ATCC 14736, CCUG 1797, CIP 63.38, L. 184, LMG 1798, LMG 2337, NCTC 9239, Véron 37

Species of bacterium

Brevundimonas vancanneytii is a Gram-negative, rod-shaped and non-spore-forming bacterium from the genus Brevundimonas which has been isolated from human blood. The bacterium has been named after doctor Marc Vancanneyt who was working at the University of Ghent.
