= Phenylobacterium falsum =

Scientific classification
- Domain: Bacteria
- Kingdom: Pseudomonadati
- Phylum: Pseudomonadota
- Class: Alphaproteobacteria
- Order: Caulobacterales
- Family: Caulobacteraceae
- Genus: Phenylobacterium
- Species: P. falsum

Binomial name
- Phenylobacterium falsum Tiago et al. 2005

Type strain
- AC-49, CIP 108469, DSM 18556, LMG 22693

Species of bacterium

Phenylobacterium falsum is a Gram negative, strictly aerobic and rod-shaped bacterium from the genus of Phenylobacterium which has been isolated from alkaline groundwater from Cabeço de Vide in Portugal.
