= Parvularcula bermudensis =

Scientific classification
- Domain: Bacteria
- Kingdom: Pseudomonadati
- Phylum: Pseudomonadota
- Class: Alphaproteobacteria
- Order: Parvularculales
- Family: Parvularculaceae
- Genus: Parvularcula
- Species: P. bermudensis

Binomial name
- Parvularcula bermudensis Cho and Giovannoni 2003

Species of bacteria

Parvularcula bermudensis is a marine bacterium which was identified in 2003 in the western Sargasso Sea in the Atlantic Ocean. It forms a deep branch in the Alphaproteobacteria, distinct from the other orders.

Parvularcula bermudensis isolates are Gram-negative, strictly aerobic, chemoheterotrophic, slightly motile short rods with a single flagellum. Colonies on marine agar are very small (0·3–0·8 mm in diameter), yellowish-brown and very hard. They are oxidase positive and catalase negative.
