= Phenylobacterium =

Scientific classification
- Domain: Bacteria
- Kingdom: Pseudomonadati
- Phylum: Pseudomonadota
- Class: Alphaproteobacteria
- Order: Caulobacterales
- Family: Caulobacteraceae
- Genus: Phenylobacterium; Lingens et al. 1985

Type species
- Phenylobacterium immobile

Species
- P. aquaticum P. composti P. conjunctum P. deserti P. falsum P. haematophilum P. hankyongense P. immobile P. koreense P. kunshanense P. lituiforme P. muchangponense P. panacis P. terrae

Genus of bacteria

Phenylobacterium is a Gram negative, strictly aerobic non-motile and bacterial genus from the family of Caulobacteraceae which can grow on chloridazon–mineral salts.
