= Appendage =

External body part or natural prolongation

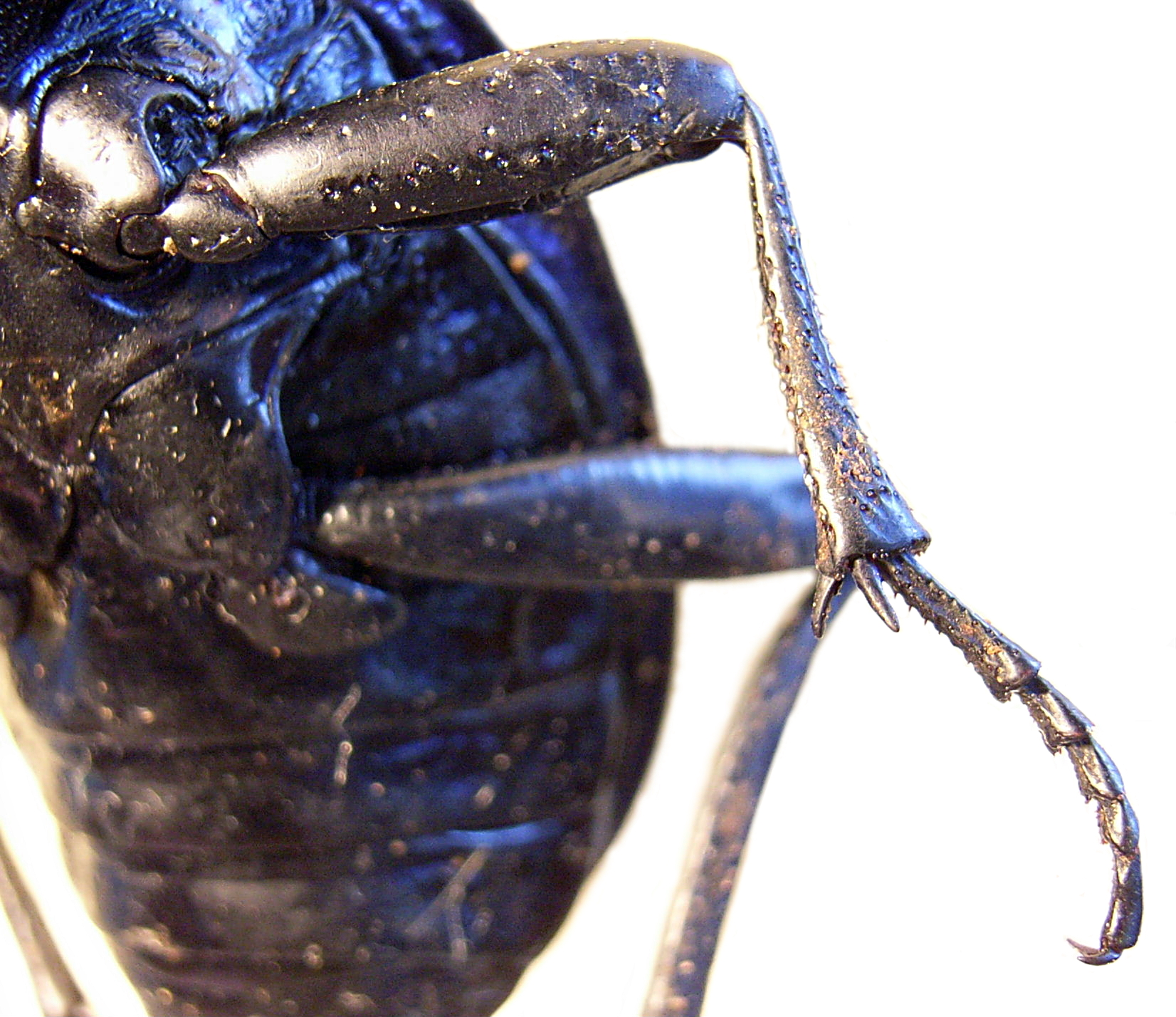
A beetle leg

An appendage (or outgrowth) is an external body part or natural prolongation that protrudes from an organism's body such as an arm or a leg. Hair, scales, and feathers are cutaneous appendages.

Protrusions from single-celled bacteria and archaea are known as cell-surface appendages or surface appendages. In many kinds of eukaryotic cells, the protrusions are known as membrane protrusions or cell appendages (examples include microvilli and cilia).

== Types in animals ==
In echinoderms an appendage called a pedicellaria is found. The end of the pedicellaria consists of valves that give a jaw-like appearance and is thought to be used to clear the external body surface. Echinoderms also possess podia known as tube feet. Tube feet form part of the water vascular system and are used for locomotion, food and waste transportation, and respiration.

In vertebrates, an appendage can refer to a locomotor part such as a tail, fins on a fish, limbs (arms, legs, flippers or wings) on a tetrapod; exposed sex organ; defensive parts such as horns and antlers; or sensory organs such as auricles, proboscis (trunk and snout) and barbels.

=== In protostomes ===
In annelid worms, lateral protrusions from the body are called parapodia. In the class of polychaetes, chitinized lateral protrusions are called chaeta.

All cephalopods, a mollusc class, have flexible appendages known as cephalopod limbs. They may have further extensions as suckers.

In arthropods, an appendage refers to any of the homologous body parts that may extend from a body segment, including antennae, mouthparts (including mandibles, maxillae and maxillipeds), gills, locomotory legs (pereiopods for walking, and pleopods for swimming), sexual organs (gonopods), and parts of the tail (uropods). All arthropod appendages are variations of the same basic structure (being homologous with one another), and which structure is produced is controlled by "homeobox" genes; alterations to these genes have allowed scientists to produce genetically modified animals, such as fruit flies (Drosophila melanogaster) with legs growing where the antennae would have on the head.

Appendages may become uniramous, as in insects and centipedes, where each appendage comprises a single series of segments, or it may be biramous, as in many crustaceans, where each appendage branches into two sections. Triramous (branching into three) appendages are also possible. In the past this difference in leg development became the basis of arthropod classification, with Uniramia being a former group within Arthropoda.

== Types in prokaryotes ==
A number of cell-surface appendages are found in prokaryotes – bacteria and archaea, and include archaella, flagella, pili, fimbriae, and prosthecae also called stalks.

=== Archaea ===
A number of cell-surface appendages may be present on different archaea. Two types of appendage are species-specific; cannulae are specific to Pyrodictium species, and hami are specific to Altiarchaeum. Other various types of surface structure include pili, archaella (archaeal flagella), structures called bindisomes that bind sugars, and posttranslationally modified archaellins and pilins.

Archaella are the similar structures to bacterial flagella, serving the same function in motility, particularly swimming, but with a different composition and action. Pili are used for attachment to surfaces, possible communication between cells enabling cell-to-cell contact allowing genetic transfer, and the formation of biofilms. A type IV pili model is used in the assembly of several cell surface structures. The bindisome is made up of sugar binding proteins to facilitate sugar uptake. So far studies are limited to S. solfataricus. Appendage fibres described as Iho670 fibres are unique to Ignicoccus hospitalis.

=== Bacteria ===
Bacterial cell-surface appendages include flagella, pili, short attachment pili known as fimbriae, and on some species curli fibres. Some bacteria also have stalks known as prosthecae. Other appendages are bacterial nanowires.

== Types in eukaryotic cells ==
Cell appendages are membrane protrusions that extend from the cell membrane, examples are microvilli and cilia.

== Types in plants ==
A leaf is the main appendage of a plant stem. Prosthechea is a genus of orchids named for the prostheca appendage on the back of the column. Hair like structures known as trichomes are found on many types of plants.

== See also ==
- Skin appendages
- Sculpture (mollusc)

== See also ==
- Appendicular skeleton
