= Coalition on the Public Understanding of Science =

The Coalition on the Public Understanding of Science (COPUS) is a United States grassroots effort linking universities, scientific societies, science advocacy groups, science media, science educators, businesses, and industry in a consortium having as its goal a greater public understanding of the nature of science and its value to society. Its premise is that full public engagement in science is critical to the long-term social well-being of the American people.

COPUS is organizing the Year of Science 2009, in cooperation with the National Academy of Sciences.

COPUS is sponsored by the American Institute of Biological Sciences and the Geological Society of America.

The COPUS national office is located in Washington, D.C., hosted by the American Institute of Biological Sciences (AIBS).

Participants in the COPUS network, as of March 19, 2007 include:

- Alaska Division of Geological & Geophysical Surveys
- Alliance for Science
- American Association of Physics Teachers
- American Fisheries Society
- American Institute of Biological Sciences
- American Society of Human Genetics
- American Society of Plant Biologists
- American Sociological Association
- Arizona Geological Survey
- Arkansas State University
- Berkeley Natural History Museums
- BioOne
- Biotechnology Institute
- Botanical Society of America
- Colorado Science Forum
- Denver Museum of Nature and Science
- Geological Society of America
- HMS Beagle Project
- Louisiana State University Museum of Natural Science
- Lyme Regis Fossil Festival - Rising Seas
- Massachusetts Society for Medical Research
- National Academy of Sciences
- National Center for Ecological Analysis and Synthesis
- National Institute of General Medical Sciences
- National Institutes of Health
- National Science Teachers Association
- New York State Museum
- Peabody Museum of Natural History at Yale University
- Pinellas County Environmental Management
- Science Education Solutions
- Society for Developmental Biology
- University of California Museum of Paleontology
- University of California Press
- University of Connecticut
- Visionlearning
- Wonderfest
