= Phenylobacterium immobile =

Scientific classification
- Domain: Bacteria
- Kingdom: Pseudomonadati
- Phylum: Pseudomonadota
- Class: Alphaproteobacteria
- Order: Caulobacterales
- Family: Caulobacteraceae
- Genus: Phenylobacterium
- Species: P. immobile

Binomial name
- Phenylobacterium immobile Lingens et al. 1985

Species of bacterium

Phenylobacterium immobile is an aerobic, gram-negative, rod or coccoid-shaped (0.7 to 1.0 by 1.0 to 2.0 μm) bacteria that is non-motile and non-spore-forming. It is notable for degrading Chloridazon. Its type strain is E (= DSM 1986).
