= Richard Losick =

American molecular biologist

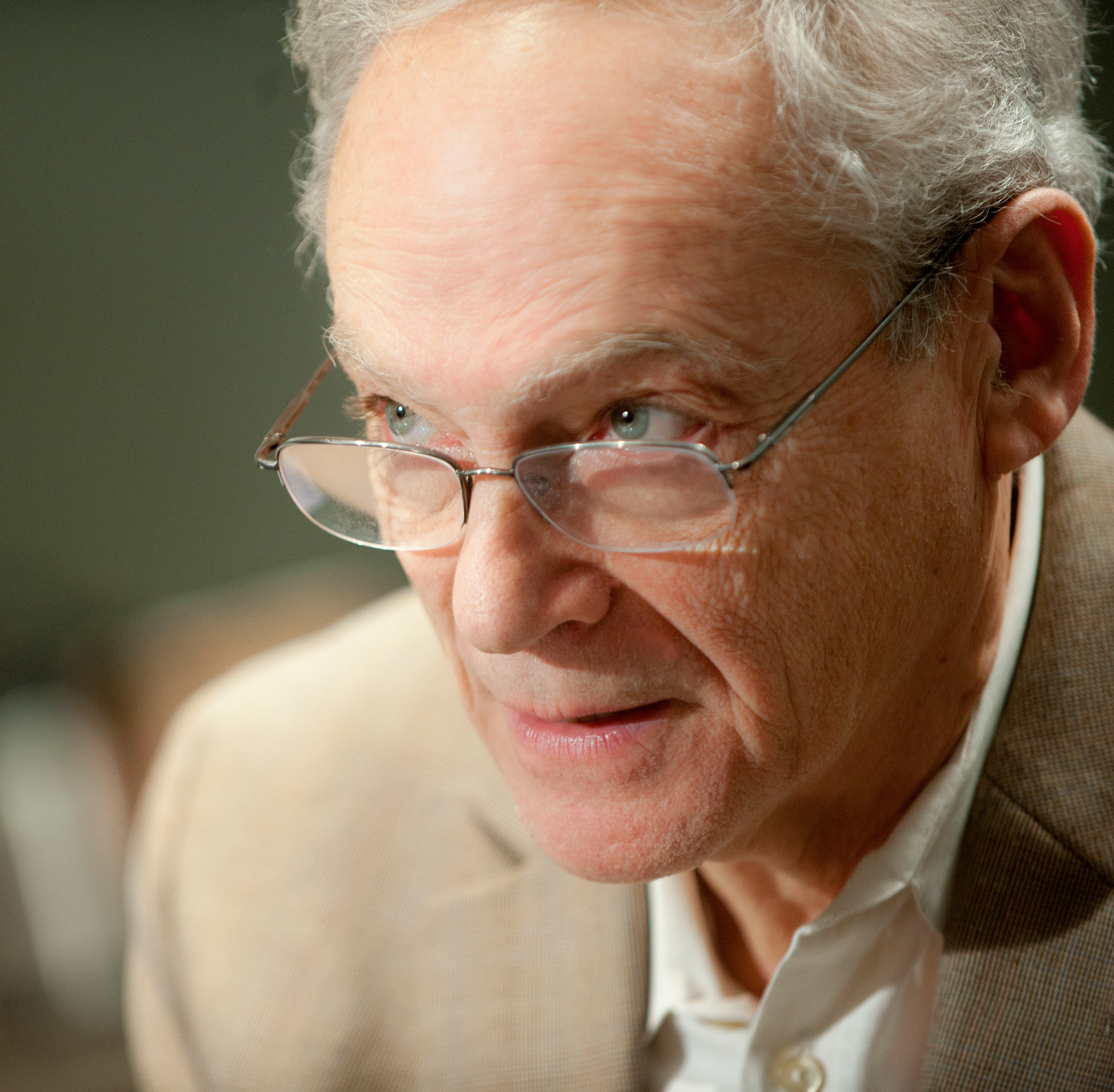
- Born: 1943 (age 82–83)
- Education: Princeton University, MIT
- Known for: Investigating endospore formation in Gram positive organisms
- Awards: National Academy of Sciences, American Academy of Arts and Sciences, American Association for the Advancement of Science, American Academy of Microbiology, American Philosophical Society, Selman A. Waksman Award in Microbiology, Louisa Gross Horwitz Prize
- Scientific career
- Fields: Molecular Biology
- Workplaces: Harvard University, Howard Hughes Medical Institute

Richard Pero Losick (/ˈloʊsɪk/ LOH-sik; born 1943) is an American molecular biologist. He is the Emeritus Maria Moors Cabot Professor of Biology at Harvard University and was from 2002 to 2024 a professor at the Howard Hughes Medical Institute. He is especially noted for his investigations of endospore formation in Gram positive organisms such as Bacillus subtilis.

== Education and career ==
Losick received his AB in Chemistry from Princeton University in 1965, and his PhD in biochemistry from Massachusetts Institute of Technology in 1969 working under supervision of Phillips Robbins. Following his graduate studies, Losick was named a Junior Fellow of the Harvard Society of Fellows, and there initially worked in the laboratory of Jack L. Strominger. He joined the Harvard faculty in 1972. He has held the position of chairman in the Departments of Cellular and Developmental Biology and Molecular and Cellular Biology. Along with Daniel Kahne, Robert Lue, and Susan Mango, he teaches Life Sciences 1a, an introductory biology and chemistry course, which was the fourth largest lecture course taught at Harvard College in 2015.

== Research ==
Losick's research interests include RNA polymerase, sigma factors, regulation of gene transcription, and bacterial development. He is known for his studies of asymmetric division in Bacillus subtilis, which divides to form one endospore and one nurturing cell. Currently, Losick studies biofilm formation by the opportunistic pathogen Staphylococcus aureus. His research group has demonstrated that chromosomal DNA is recycled to form an electrostatic extracellular net in order to hold neighboring bacterial cells together. Notable trainees include Robert Tjian.

== Awards and honors ==
- Camille and Henry Dreyfus Teacher-Scholar Award, The Camille and Henry Dreyfus Foundation (1973)
- Member, National Academy of Sciences (1992)
- Member, American Academy of Arts and Sciences (1996)
- Member, American Association for the Advancement of Science (1998)
- Fellow, American Academy of Microbiology (elected prior to 2000)
- Visiting Fellow, Phi Beta Kappa (2000)
- Member, American Philosophical Society (2005)
- Selman A. Waksman Award in Microbiology, National Academy of Sciences (2007)
- Gairdner Foundation International Award (2009)
- Louisa Gross Horwitz Prize, Columbia University (2012)
