= Lucy Shapiro =

American developmental biologist

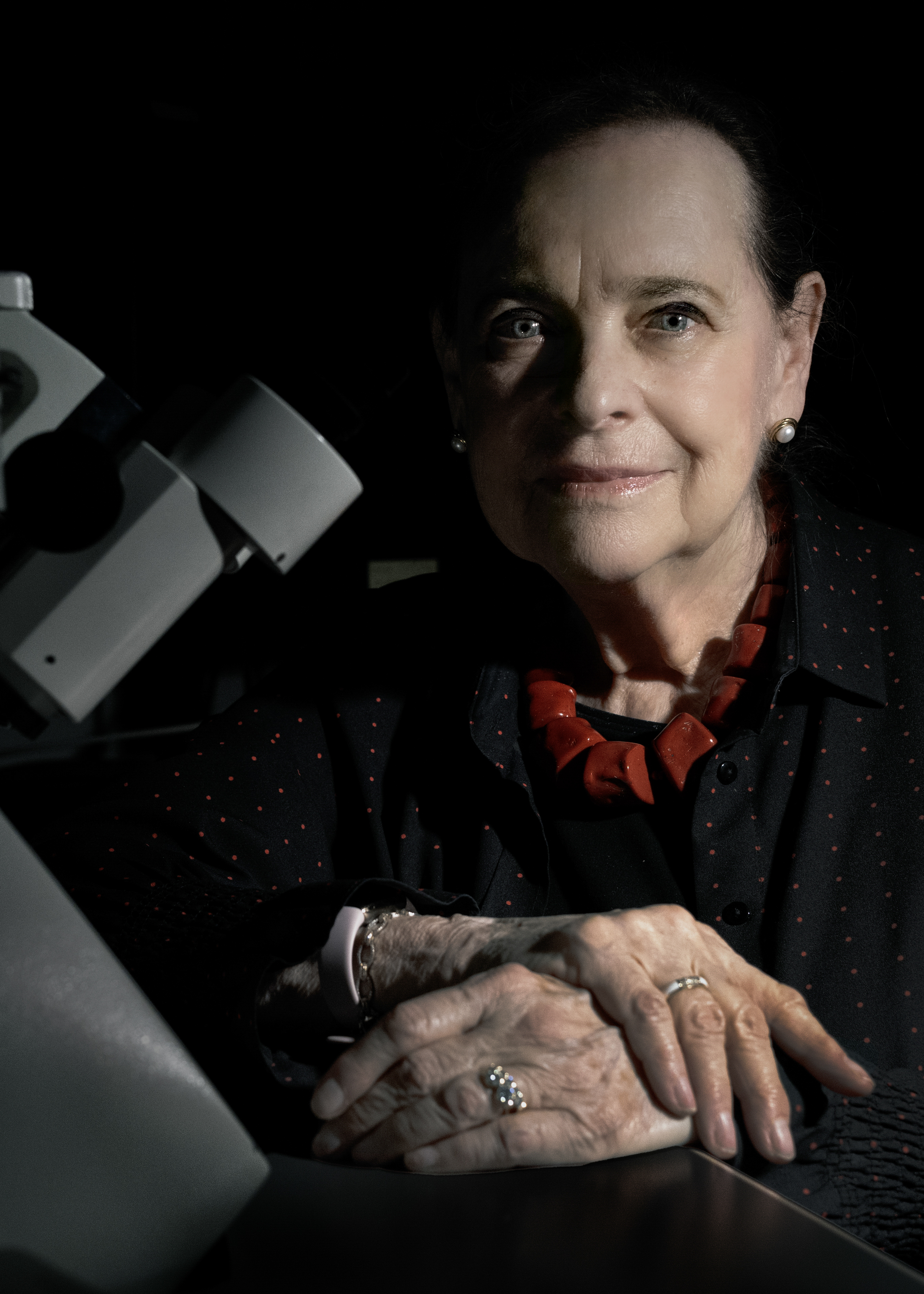
- Born: July 16, 1940 (age 86); New York City, New York
- Education: Brooklyn College; Albert Einstein College of Medicine
- Known for: Identification of the molecular mechanisms of cell cycle regulation and asymmetric cell division, and characterization of the systems biology of bacterial development.
- Spouse: Harley McAdams
- Awards: Selman A. Waksman Award in Microbiology (2005); Gairdner Foundation International Award (2009); National Medal of Science (2011); Louisa Gross Horwitz Prize (2012); Pearl Meister Greengard Prize (2014)
- Scientific career
- Fields: Developmental biology; microbial genetics; bacterial cell biology
- Workplaces: Albert Einstein College of Medicine, Stanford University
- Website: http://shapirolab.stanford.edu

External videos
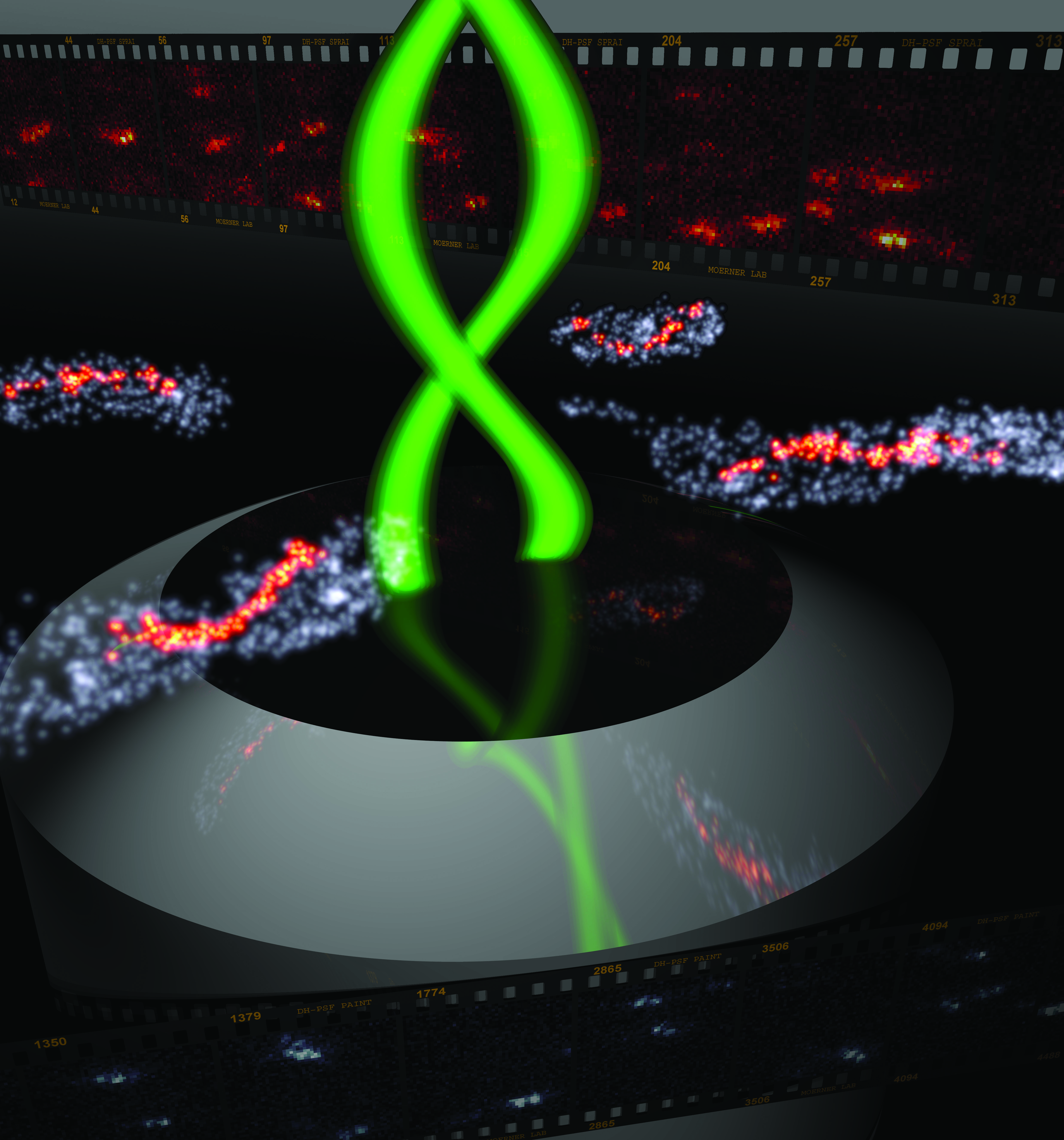
- Lucy Shapiro – 2011 National Medal of Science
- Part 1: Dynamics of the Bacterial Chromosome, Lucy Shapiro (Stanford University)
- Part 2: Escalating Infectious Disease Threat, Lucy Shapiro (Stanford University)

Lucy Shapiro (born July 16, 1940, New York City) is an American developmental biologist. She is a professor of Developmental Biology at the Stanford University School of Medicine. She is the Virginia and D.K. Ludwig Professor of Cancer Research and the director of the Beckman Center for Molecular and Genetic Medicine.

Shapiro founded a new field in developmental biology, using microorganisms to examine fundamental questions in developmental biology. Her work has furthered understanding of the basis of stem cell function and the generation of biological diversity. Her ideas have revolutionized understanding of bacterial genetic networks and helped researchers to develop novel drugs to fight antibiotic resistance and emerging infectious diseases. In 2013, Shapiro was presented with the 2011 National Medal of Science. for "her pioneering discovery that the bacterial cell is controlled by an integrated genetic circuit functioning in time and space that serves as a systems engineering paradigm underlying cell differentiation and ultimately the generation of diversity in all organisms."

== Early life and education ==
Lucy Shapiro was born in Brooklyn, New York City, the eldest of three daughters. Her mother was an elementary school teacher and her father, a Ukrainian immigrant. She attended New York City's High School of Music and Arts with a major in Fine Arts.

Shapiro enrolled in Brooklyn College with a double major in Fine Arts and Biology and the intention of becoming a medical illustrator. As part of an experimental honors program she was able to design her own curriculum. With the encouragement of Theodore Shedlovsky, she talked her way into an honors organic chemistry class. There her spatial and scientific interests reinforced each other as she visualized the spatial properties of organic molecules in three dimensions. She received her A.B. in Fine Arts and Biology from Brooklyn College in 1962.

In fall 1962 Shapiro was hired as a lab technician by J. Thomas August and Jerard Hurwitz in the department of microbiology at the New York University (NYU) school of medicine. Hurwitz was a co-discoverer of DNA-dependent RNA polymerase. Shapiro was given the task of looking for RNA-dependent RNA polymerase using F2 RNA phage from Norton Zinder. She was successful in detecting the activity of an enzyme copying RNA. In 1963 Shapiro became a graduate student at NYU with Tom August as her advisor. The department subsequently joined the newly created department of molecular biology at the Albert Einstein College of Medicine. Shapiro also attended summer courses at Cold Spring Harbor Laboratory (CSHL) on Long Island. Shapiro earned her Ph.D. at the Albert Einstein College of Medicine in 1966, with the thesis Replication of bacteriophage RNA.

Shapiro has published reflections on her early days in Brooklyn and on her life in science in the Journal of Biological Chemistry and in the Annual Review of Genetics.

== Work ==
=== Academic positions ===
Shapiro initially planned to do postdoctoral work elsewhere, but was offered a faculty position at Einstein by Bernard Horecker. Horecker proposed that she take three months to think about fundamental questions and the direction of her future research life. Shapiro identified positional information as a key research area, asking how spatial information is genetically encoded and translated, to create the three-dimensional organization of a cell and to form different daughter cells through cell division. With how a cell organizes its three-dimensional structure as her focus, Shapiro launched her own lab at Einstein in 1967.

Shapiro remained at the Albert Einstein College of Medicine from 1967–1986, as assistant professor, associate professor, and professor. In 1977, she became chair of the department of molecular biology and in 1981, director of Einstein's division of biological sciences. In 1983, she was named to the Lola and Saul Kramer Endowed Chair in Molecular Biology, Albert Einstein College of Medicine, NYC.

From 1986–1989, Shapiro served as the Higgins Professor and Chair of Microbiology at the College of Physicians and Surgeons of Columbia University.

In 1989, Shapiro became a professor and the founding chair of the department of developmental biology at Stanford University School of Medicine, Stanford, California. She was the Joseph D. Grant Professor in the school of medicine from 1989–1998, before becoming the Virginia and D.K. Ludwig Professor of Cancer Research in 1998. In 2001 Shapiro became the director of the Beckman Center for Molecular and Genetic Medicine at Stanford University School of Medicine.

'If you are confident in what you are talking about, and your science is excellent, there is no need to be intimidated by anyone,' says Shapiro. 'This is particularly important for women in science.'

=== Industry positions ===
- 1993–2000: Director, Silicon Graphics, Inc.
- 1993–2000: Director, SmithKlineBeecham
- 2000–2006: Director, Glaxo Smith Kline
- 2002: Founded Anacor Pharmaceuticals, Inc. with Dr. Stephen Benkovic, Penn State University, and Dr. Harley McAdams, Stanford University School of Medicine.
- 2002: Director, Anacor Pharmaceuticals, Inc.
- 2008–2012: Director, GenProbe, Inc.
- 2012: Director, Pacific BioSciences, Inc.
- 2015: Founded Boragen, LLC with Stephen Benkovic, Gerry Fink and Paul Schimmel
- 2021: Director, 5Metis, Inc.

=== Achievements ===
After six months as a postdoctoral student at Albert Einstein College of Medicine, Shapiro was asked to join the faculty and establish her own lab. Asked what she most wanted to work on, Shapiro decided that she was fascinated by how a one-dimensional genetic code, DNA, could be translated into three-dimensional organisms. Shapiro wanted to go beyond test-tube studies of extracted cell contents, and examine the three-dimensional structure and behavior of actual living cells. "I found the simplest organism I could, and set out to learn how the multiple components of a living cell work together." She selected a single-celled organism, Caulobacter crescentus, and began attempting to identify the specific biological processes controlling the cell's cycle.

What she and her students discovered overturned accepted beliefs about bacterial cell biology. In each cell cycle, Caulobacter divides asymmetrically into two daughters. One, the swarmer cell, has a tail-like flagellum that helps it swim; the other daughter has a stalk which anchors it to a surface. Swarmer cells become stalked cells after a short period of motility. Chromosome replication and cell division only occur in stalked cells. Rather than containing an evenly dispersed mixture of proteins, the single celled Caulobacter resembles a highly organized factory, with specific "machinery" regulating each step in the cell cycle to ensure that changes occur at developmentally appropriate times. DNA is copied once per cycle by a particular group of molecules. Once a single DNA copy is placed in each half of the cell, other mechanisms constricts the cell's middle to separate it into two daughters. Shapiro was the first researcher to show that bacterial DNA replication occurs in a spatially organized way and that cell division is dependent on this spatial organization.

By the late 1990s, Shapiro and graduate student Michael Laub were able to study the genetic basis of cell cycle progression and consequently the identification of three regulatory proteins, DnaA, GcrA, and CtrA, which controlled complex temporal and spatial behaviors affecting large numbers of genes. With Dickon Alley and Janine Maddock, she showed that chemoreceptor proteins occupy specific areas within the cell. Shapiro and Christine Jacobs-Wagner as well as Janine Maddock showed that signaling phosphokinases also had specific positions at the cell poles. In 2004, using time-lapse microscopy and fluorescent tags, Shapiro demonstrated that chromosomal regions are duplicated in both an orderly and a location-specific manner, involving "a much higher degree of spatial organization than previously thought".

By studying the regulation of the cell cycle, asymmetric cell division, and cellular differentiation, Shapiro's work has led to a much deeper understanding of the genetic and molecular processes that cause identical bacterial cells to split into different cell types. These are basic processes that underlie all life, from single-cell bacteria to multi-cellular organisms. The process of the Caulobacter cell cycle also show similarities to stem cell division, in which two distinct cells arise, one of which differs from the parent cell while the other does not.

Since 1995, her work with Harley McAdams has applied insights and analysis techniques from the field of electrical circuitry to bacteria, to examine how biological systems work as a whole. Genome-based computational modelling, in particular, the examination of regulatory networks, is becoming increasingly important to systems biology. Examining the cell cycle control logic of Caulobacter as a state machine leads to understanding of bacterial cell cycle regulation as a whole cell phenomenon.

=== Biotechnology ===
In 2002, Shapiro founded Anacor Pharmaceuticals with physicist and developmental biologist Harley McAdams and chemist Stephen Benkovic of Pennsylvania State University. to design and develop new types of antibiotics and antifungals. They have developed a novel class of small molecules involving a Boron atom, and produced one of two new antifungal agents to be created in the last 25 years., approved by the FDA as a treatment for toe nail fungus, Kerydin. A second drug, Crisaborole, was developed to treat atopic dermatitis. In 2015, Shapiro, Benkovic, Fink and Schimmel founded Boragen, LLC to use the boron containing library for crop protection.

=== Advocacy ===
Shapiro has advised both the Clinton administration and the second Bush administration. She belongs to the Center for International Security and Cooperation at the Freeman Spogli Institute for International Studies at Stanford University. She is particularly concerned about the potential impact of emerging infectious diseases. There are a number of issues that make infectious diseases a particularly significant concern. One issue is the development of antibiotic-resistant microbes, which have been emerging as a result of over-use of antibiotics since the 1950s. Shapiro is involved in development of drugs that will attack both a particular bacteria and its mechanisms of drug resistance, to prevent drug-resistant strains from developing. Another concern is the introduction of bacteria into previously unexposed populations, due to increased travel, population expansion into previously unexplored areas, and climate change. This includes the development of zoönotic diseases which travel from one species to another, such as influenza. To address either naturally occurring or intentionally developed biological threats, it is essential to understand the mechanisms involved internally in cells and in populations of cells in their environments. Shapiro emphasizes the importance of understanding the complexity of living systems, and the need to be aware that interventions may have unexpected consequences.

== Awards and honors ==
- 2025: Lasker–Koshland Special Achievement Award in Medical Science
- 2023: Linus Pauling Medal
- 2020: Doctorate of Science, Honoris Causa, Rockefeller University.
- 2020: Dickson Prize in Science.
- 2017: Chan Zuckerberg Biohub investigator.
- 2017: Alumna of the Year, Brooklyn College
- 2014: Pearl Meister Greengard Prize
- 2013: ASCB Women in Cell Biology Lifetime Achievement Award, American Society for Cell Biology
- 2012: Louisa Gross Horwitz Prize (Columbia University), with Richard Losick & Joe Lutkenhaus
- 2012: Dean's Medal, Stanford University School of Medicine
- 2011: National Medal of Science
- 2010: Distinguished Alumna, Albert Einstein College of Medicine
- 2010: Abbott Lifetime Achievement Award, American Society for Microbiology
- 2009: Canada Gairdner International Award with Richard Losick
- 2009: John Scott Legacy Medal and Premium, with Harley McAdams
- 2008: Hitchcock Professorship, UC Berkeley
- 2005: Selman A. Waksman Award in Microbiology
- 2003: Elected to the American Philosophical Society
- 1994: National Academy of Sciences
- 1993: American Academy of Microbiology
- 1992: American Academy of Arts and Sciences
- 1991: Institute of Medicine of the National Academy of Sciences
- 1983: Distinguished Alumna, Brooklyn College
