= Immobile =

Immobile may refer to:

- Ciro Immobile (born 1990), Italian footballer
- Immobile Łuczniczka, sport, show and fair arena in Bydgoszcz, Kuyavian–Pomeranian, Poland
- Immobile (album), a 1998 rock album
- "Immobile" (song), a 2009 pop song
- Phenylobacterium immobile, a bacteria

== See also ==
- Immobilization (disambiguation)
- Immobilizer (disambiguation)
- Immobilon
- Mobilities antonym
