= Erin K. O'Shea =

American biologist

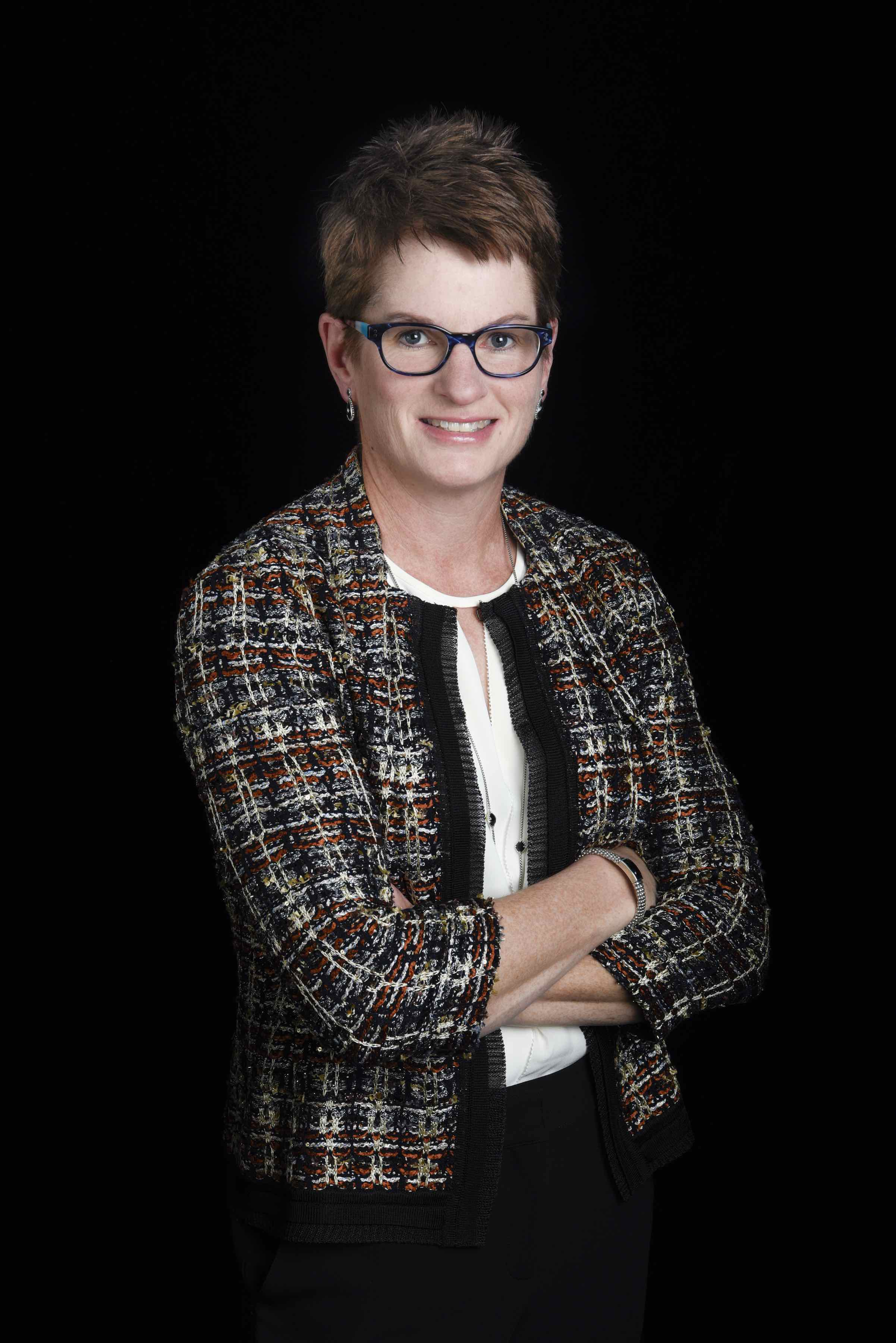
- Education: Smith College (BS); Massachusetts Institute of Technology (MS, PhD)
- Spouse: Douglas Jeffery
- Awards: NAS Award in Molecular Biology (2001)
- Scientific career
- Fields: Biochemistry
- Workplaces: Harvard University; Howard Hughes Medical Institute
- Doctoral advisor: Peter S. Kim
- Other academic advisors: Robert Tjian; Ira Herskowitz

Erin K. O'Shea is an American biologist who is president of the Howard Hughes Medical Institute (HHMI). In 2013, she was named HHMI's vice president and chief scientific officer. Prior to that, she was a professor of molecular and cellular biology and chemistry and chemical biology at Harvard University. In 2016, her appointment as future, and first woman, president of HHMI was announced. She has been a Howard Hughes Medical Institute (HHMI) investigator since 2000.

== Early life and education ==
Erin O'Shea is one of five children, born in Leroy, New York.

O'Shea earned her Bachelor of Arts in biochemistry from Smith College in 1988 and her PhD in chemistry from MIT in 1992 at age 26 working with Peter S. Kim studying leucine zippers. She was a postdoctoral fellow at University of California, Berkeley, from 1992 to 1993.

== Career and research ==
During her postdoctoral fellowship, O'Shea worked with Robert Tjian and Ira Herskowitz studying chromatin regulation of transcription in yeast. When she was joined by her graduate school colleague Jonathan Weissman, they began to determine the location and abundance of all of the proteins in the yeast genome. They ultimately made two libraries both with GFP-fused protein with tandem affinity purification (TAP)-tags.

After her PhD, O'Shea was briefly a Basic Research Fellow before joining the faculty of University of California, San Francisco as an assistant professor in 1993.

In 2005, she was recruited to Harvard University to be the director of the (FAS) Center for Systems Biology and a professor of molecular and cellular biology and chemistry and chemical biology. Her research is focused on gene regulation and the biology of a three-protein circadian clock. In 2012, she was elected to be HHMI's new vice president and chief scientific officer, leading the HHMI Investigator Program, and then became HHMI president in 2016. She continues to maintain her lab at Janelia. During her presidency, in 2025, HHMI cancelled their Inclusive Excellence 3 (IE3) program, which was a 6-year (2022–2028) $8.8 million award they had committed to the IMPACT STEM Network, which sought to enhance undergraduate science education and research, following incoming president Donald Trump's administration elimination of programs devoted to diversity, equity, and inclusion across all U.S. scientific agencies.

== Awards and honors ==
O'Shea was a Packard Foundation Fellow in 1994, and won young investigator awards from the American Society for Cell Biology in 2000, and the Protein Society in 2001. She was selected as an HHMI investigator in 2000.

In 2001, O'Shea won the NAS Award in Molecular Biology for "contributions to our understanding of signal transduction, regulation of protein movement into and out of the nucleus, and how phosphorylation controls protein activity".

O'Shea was elected to the National Academy of Sciences in 2004, as well as the American Academy of Arts and Sciences. She was elected a member of the American Philosophical Society in 2019.

== Personal life ==
O'Shea is married to her former PhD student, Douglas Jeffery.

She trained her dog, Zambo, from when he was a puppy. Zambo became national champion and then world champion in 2011, at the Universal World Sieger Championship in Austria.
