= Brevundimonas =

Scientific classification
- Domain: Bacteria
- Kingdom: Pseudomonadati
- Phylum: Pseudomonadota
- Class: Alphaproteobacteria
- Order: Caulobacterales
- Family: Caulobacteraceae
- Genus: Brevundimonas; Segers et al. 1994

Species
- B. abyssalis B. alba B. albigilva B. aurantiaca B. aveniformis B. bacteroides B. balnearis B. basaltis B. bullata B. canariensis B. denitrificans B. diminuta B. faecalis B. fluminis B. goettingensis B. halotolerans B. humi B. intermedia B. kwangchunensis B. lenta B. lutea B. mediterranea B. mongoliensis B. naejangsanensis B. nasdae B. poindexterae B. pondensis B. staleyi B. subvibrioides B. terrae B. vancanneytii B. variabilis B. vesicularis B. viscosa

Genus of bacteria

Brevundimonas is a genus of bacteria. They are Gram-negative, non-fermenting, aerobic bacilli. Brevundimonas species are ubiquitous in the environment but are rarely isolated from clinical samples, although numbers are increasing. Two species of Brevundimonas originally classified under the genus Pseudomonas have been re-classified by Seger et al. as Brevundimonas vesicularis and Brevundimonas diminuta.

== Etymology ==
The name Brevundimonas derives from: Latin adjective brevis, short; Latin feminine gender noun unda, a wave; Latin feminine gender noun monas (μονάς), nominally meaning "a unit", but in effect meaning a bacterium; Neo-Latin feminine gender noun Brevundimonas, bacteria with short wavelength flagella.

Members of the genus Brevundimonas can be referred to as brevundimonad (viz. Trivialisation of names).
