= CrfA RNA =

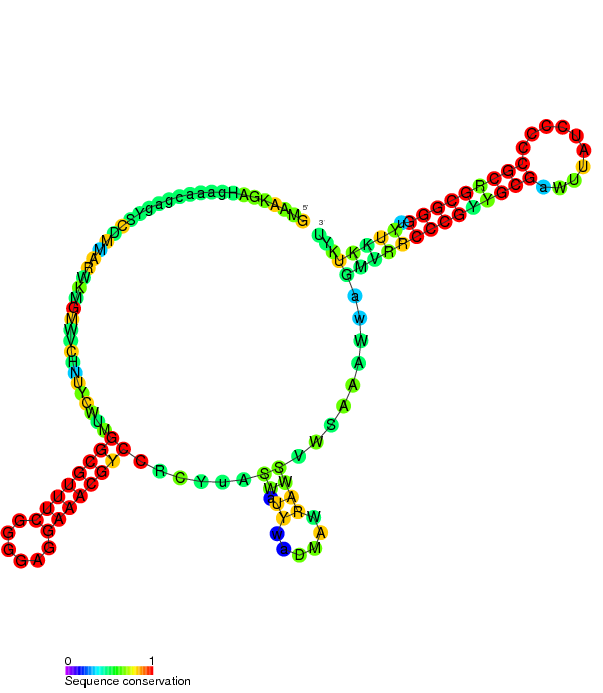
- Conserved secondary structure of CrfA RNA.

Identifiers
- Symbol: CrfA

Other data
- Domain(s): Caulobacter
- PDB structures: PDBe

CrfA RNA (Caulobacter response to famine RNA) is a family of non-coding RNAs found in Caulobacter crescentus. CrfA is expressed upon carbon starvation and is thought to activate 27 genes. It was originally identified along with 26 other non-coding RNAs using a tiled Caulobacter microarray protocol specifically aimed at detecting small RNAs.

CrfA RNA is one of only 8 putative ncRNAs conserved in the closely related Caulobacter sp. K31.

== Carbon starvation response ==
CrfA was found to be upregulated 10-fold in C. crescentus when glucose was deprived in a minimal medium. Further experimentation found the response to be specific to carbon deprivation; its expression was not increased when phosphate or nitrogen were limiting factors.

Affymetrix microarrays were then used to analyse changes in the transcriptome in response to increased CrfA. Seven affected gene products were TonB-dependent receptors, outer membrane proteins which facilitate the uptake of external substrate. The upregulation of these proteins could increase the carbon uptake during starvation. Another CrfA regulated gene (EntrezGene CC_1363) is thought to encode a proton pump powered by pyrophosphate hydrolysis. Increasing production of this protein could enable the cell to maintain its electrochemical gradient and power ATP synthesis during carbon starvation.

σ^{54} regulates many other proteins involved in the carbon starvation response at the level of transcription.
