= Eduardo Abeliuk =

American entrepreneur

Eduardo Abeliuk (born in Santiago, Chile) is a Silicon Valley entrepreneur and technologist. He co-founded TeselaGen Biotech, a Synthetic Biology company based in San Francisco, a spin-off from the Lawrence Berkeley National Laboratory. He founded ClassroomTV - an Educational technology company operating in Latin America - and KissMe, one of the early viral Facebook applications.

== Early life ==
Abeliuk earned a double bachelor's degree in Physics and in Electrical Engineering from University of Chile. He earned a M.S. in Bioengineering and a Ph.D. in Electrical Engineering from Stanford University.

== Career ==
Abeliuk is co-founder and CTO of TeselaGen Biotech, a San Francisco based company that has developed a technological platform for Synthetic Biology. TeselaGen is supported by the U.S. National Science Foundation. He also founded ClassroomTv, an early MOOC platform focusing on corporate online training.

During his PhD, he used computational biology techniques to predicted the existence of novel small RNA molecules, confirmed through biochemistry experiments by Stanford colleagues. One of these RNA molecules, CrfA RNA, is associated with carbon starvation. Abeliuk co-developed a technique used to identify the essential genome of an organism by coupling high-throughput DNA sequencing with transposon mutagenesis. He was part of the Facebook Class at Stanford University, a group of computer scientists who created a series of successful Facebook applications. He co-founded KissMe in 2007, based on the group's first Facebook application to reach 1 million users 4 weeks after launch, which was subsequently acquired.

== Selected publications ==
- Landt, Stephen G.; Abeliuk, Eduardo (2012), A Strategy for Identifying Noncoding RNAs Using Whole-Genome Tiling Arrays, Methods in Molecular Biology, vol. 905, Totowa, NJ: Humana Press, pp. 29–39, doi:10.1007/978-1-61779-949-5_3, ISBN 978-1-61779-948-8, PMID 22735996
- Zhou, Bo; Schrader, Jared M.; Kalogeraki, Virginia S.; Abeliuk, Eduardo; Dinh, Cong B.; Pham, James Q.; Cui, Zhongying Z.; Dill, David L.; McAdams, Harley H.; Shapiro, Lucy (2015-01-08). "The Global Regulatory Architecture of Transcription during the Caulobacter Cell Cycle". PLOS Genetics. 11 (1) e1004831. doi:10.1371/journal.pgen.1004831. ISSN 1553-7404. PMC 4287350. PMID 25569173.
- Christen, Beat; Abeliuk, Eduardo; Collier, John M.; Kalogeraki, Virginia S.; Passarelli, Ben; Coller, John A.; Fero, Michael J.; McAdams, Harley H.; Shapiro, Lucy (2011-08-30). "The essential genome of a bacterium". Molecular Systems Biology. 7 MSB201158: 528. doi:10.1038/msb.2011.58. ISSN 1744-4292. PMC 3202797. PMID 21878915.
- Goley, Erin D.; Yeh, Yi-Chun; Hong, Sun-Hae; Fero, Michael J.; Abeliuk, Eduardo; McAdams, Harley H.; Shapiro, Lucy (2011-05-17). "Assembly of the Caulobacter cell division machine". Molecular Microbiology. 80 (6): 1680–1698. doi:10.1111/j.1365-2958.2011.07677.x. ISSN 0950-382X. PMC 3707389. PMID 21542856.
- Britos, Leticia; Abeliuk, Eduardo; Taverner, Thomas; Lipton, Mary; McAdams, Harley; Shapiro, Lucy (2011-04-11). "Regulatory Response to Carbon Starvation in Caulobacter crescentus". PLOS ONE. 6 (4) e18179. Bibcode:2011PLoSO...618179B. doi:10.1371/journal.pone.0018179. ISSN 1932-6203. PMC 3073932. PMID 21494595.
- Landt, Stephen G.; Abeliuk, Eduardo; McGrath, Patrick T.; Lesley, Joseph A.; McAdams, Harley H.; Shapiro, Lucy (May 2008). "Small non-coding RNAs in Caulobacter crescentus". Molecular Microbiology. 68 (3): 600–614. doi:10.1111/j.1365-2958.2008.06172.x. ISSN 1365-2958. PMC 7540941. PMID 18373523.
- Srinivasan, B. S.; Shah, N. H.; Flannick, J. A.; Abeliuk, E.; Novak, A. F.; Batzoglou, S. (2007-06-20). "Current progress in network research: toward reference networks for key model organisms". Briefings in Bioinformatics. 8 (5): 318–332. doi:10.1093/bib/bbm038. ISSN 1467-5463. PMID 17728341.
