= Hamus (archaea) =

Archaeal appendage

Archaea, one of the three domains of life, are a highly diverse group of prokaryotes that include a number of extremophiles. One of these extremophiles has given rise to a highly complex new appendage known as the hamus (pl.: hami). In contrast to the well-studied prokaryotic appendages pili and fimbriae, much is yet to be discovered about archaeal appendage such as hami. Appendages serve multiple functions for cells and are often involved in attachment, horizontal conjugation, and movement. The unique appendage was discovered at the same time as the unique community of archaea that produces them. Research into the structure of hami suggests their main function aids in attachment and biofilm formation. This is accomplished due to their evenly placed prickles, helical structure, and barbed end. These appendages are heat and acid resistant, aiding in the cell's ability to live in extreme environments.

== Archaeal background ==
In 1977, archaea, then known as archaebacteria, were first discovered when Carl Woese and George Fox published their findings in the Proceedings of the National Academy of Sciences, stating that these organisms were distantly related to bacteria. This revolutionized biology into the three domains of life known today; Bacteria, Eukarya, and Archaea. By checking the ratios of biogenic isotopes that are unique to different metabolisms, scientists have dated archaea as far back as 2,500 million years. Due to oxygen being a trace element in the atmosphere at this time, archaea anaerobic methanotrophy is believed to have preceded bacterial aerobic methanotrophy. When studying phylogenetic trees, Bacteria are evolved from the last universal common ancestor or LUCA, while Archaea and Eukarya are considered sister lineages because they share a last common ancestor that is more recent than LUCA.

== Hami function ==
Archaea, much like other microorganisms, possess a variety of extracellular appendages to facilitate important functions such as motility, cell adhesion, and DNA transfer. Unlike fimbriae and pili, whose composition and function(s) are well defined among bacterial species, hami belong to a relatively new class of filamentous cell appendages unique to archaea. Archaeal cells may have as many as 100 hami, which are largely composed of 120 kDa subunits. Each hamus is helical in shape with many hook-like projections at the distal end, which are hypothesized to aid in attachment to surfaces within the environment, or in the formation of biofilms.

== Hami producers ==
SM1 Euryarchaeon belongs to the Euryarchaeota phylum.

Archaeal cells possessing hami appear to grow only in relatively cold aquatic environments around 10 degrees Celsius, which could be suggestive of a particular function that has not yet been defined. One possible explanation for this observation could be the relationship archaeal cells – SM1 euryarchaeon, possessing hami – have with Thiothrix, a type of sulfur-oxidizing bacterium typically found within similar conditions. Hamus-bearing archaeal cells sometimes form macroscopically visible communities with Thiothrix or IMB1 ε-proteobacterium, called a string-of-pearls. Thiothrix and IMB1 ε- proteobacterium are filamentous bacteria that appear to form the outer shell of the pearl as well as the strings that connect these pearls together. Within the pearls, it appears the archaea SM1 euryarchaeon forms the majority of the core. Research has shown the SM1 euryarchaeon use the hamus to aid in biofilm formation. The formation of string-of-pearls communities suggests a mutual dependency for nutrient exchange, though the entirety of this unique relationship has yet to be established. Another hami producing biofilm was discovered that was dissimilar from the string pearl formation. This biofilm consists almost entirely of SM1 archaea making it the first biofilm found of this nature as no other biofilm with a nearly pure composition of archaea has been found. This biofilm has a highly organized structure with distances between cells being exceptionally consistent. Scientists speculate the hami are not only responsible for the strong attachments found in the biofilm formation but also this highly intricate and specific structure. It is possible that other archaeal cells possessing hami have not yet been discovered or cultured.

== Hami special abilities ==
Archaeal appendages serve a variety of purposes and provide the archaeal cells with multiple unique and essential abilities. Hami play a large role in cellular attachment. These appendages allow the cells to adhere to each other, as well as their surroundings. When the hami filaments of one cell come into contact with a neighboring cell, the hami are able to entangle and produce a web like structure between the cells. This helps to form and maintain the biofilm. Hami are also used by the cells in biofilms or individually to adhere to external environmental surfaces. They have been proven to attach to substances with varying chemical compositions including those of an inorganic nature. Hami are also capable of contributing to the EPS of the cell as part of the main protein component of the EPS.

One interesting facet of these hami is that their 120 kDa protein allows them to remain stable over a broad range of temperatures. One research experiment found hami to be stable at 70 degrees C and noted the finding curious as the only currently known hami-producing cells live in 10 degrees C. These hami were also noted to be stable over a significant pH range of 0.5-11.5. Archaea are known as extremophiles and live in extreme environments, but this capacity to remain stable over a large range of both pH and temperature makes hami unique structures. Similarly, this lends to the possibility that archaeal hami may exist in other yet to be discovered biofilms outside of the 10 degree C temperature range and in various pH ranges.

== See also ==
- Cannula (archaea)
- Pilus
