= Nathan H. Lents =

American scientist, author, and professor (born 1978)

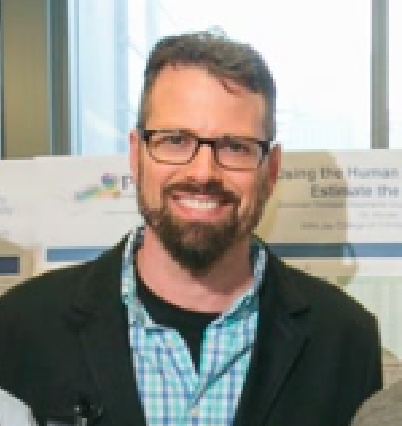
- Nathan H. Lents in 2017
- Born: 1978 (age 47–48)
- Occupations: Author; Professor
- Writing career
- Genre: Popular Science
- Website: nathanlents.wordpress.com

Nathan H. Lents is an American scientist, author, and university professor. He has been on the faculty of John Jay College since 2006 and is currently the director of the Cell and Molecular Biology program and the former head of the honors program and the campus Macaulay Honors College program. Lents is noted for his work in genetics, evolution, cell biology, and forensic science, as well as his popular science writing and blogging on the evolution of human biology and behavior. Lents is also a visiting faculty member at the University of Lincoln in the UK and a fellow with the Committee for Skeptical Inquiry.

== Early life and education ==
Lents was born and raised in Decatur, Illinois and graduated from St. Teresa High School. He then attended Saint Louis University and graduated summa cum laude with a B.S degree in biology.

Lents moved to Saint Louis University School of Medicine for his doctoral work and graduated with a Ph.D. in Pharmacological and Physiological Sciences in 2004. He completed postdoctoral training in cancer genomics at NYU Medical Center under the direction of Brian David Dynlacht. He then joined the faculty of forensic science at John Jay College and the doctoral faculty of biochemistry at the CUNY Graduate Center.

Lents was promoted to Associate Professor with tenure in 2011 and attained the rank of full professor at John Jay College in 2016, his tenth year on the faculty.

== Research ==
While an undergraduate at Saint Louis University in the 1990s, Lents conducted research with Biology Department chair Robert I. Bolla on the biochemical interactions between soybean plants and the soybean cyst nematode, a key cause of soybean crop loss in the United States. Specifically, he discovered that the CF-9 gene cluster correlated with resistance to nematodes in soybean strains.

During this same time period, Lents also worked in the fermentation research division of agribusiness giant Archer Daniels Midland, conducting basic microbiology research on the soil bacteria Corynebacterium glutamicum, which is used in the production of amino acids for food additives. Specifically, he worked on the production of lysine, a product that was the subject of a global price-fixing conspiracy. ADM plead guilty to antitrust violations and was forced to pay $100 million, the largest antitrust fine in US history. Several top ADM executives served prison sentences, but none of the scientists in the lysine group were implicated in any wrongdoing.

Since 2000, Lents has published research reports in the area of cell and cancer biology, genetics, forensic science, as well as the teaching and learning of science, particularly evolution. Lents has been funded by the National Institutes of Health, National Science Foundation, Susan G. Komen Breast Cancer Foundation, and the US Department of Education. His early work focused on the cell cycle and cancer biology, particularly the G1 to S phase transition. Specifically, Lents and colleagues showed that activation of the MAP kinase cascade is necessary and sufficient for a key phosphorylation step in the activation of cyclin-dependent kinase 2, an important cell cycle enzyme. In addition, as a PhD student, Lents developed an innovative "reverse mutational" approach to discovering key phosphorylation sites on the Retinoblastoma protein, one of the most important tumor suppressors.

In 2008, Lents discovered a new splice variant for the Mdm2 oncogene that is induced upon treatment with DNA-damaging cancer chemotherapies. His laboratory later discovered new genetic connections between Vitamin D, the transcription factor MZF1, and the CCN gene family, work that has led him and others to call for exploration of the usefulness of vitamin D as a possible enhancement for cancer treatments.

Lents has also published research in the area of forensic biology and toxicology. His laboratory was among the first to note that zinc supplements can be effective in masking the presence of certain drug metabolites during routine drug testing. In 2016, he published work on the skin microbiome of decomposing human cadavers. He also developed and patented a DNA-based forensic method of species identification of trace plant material.

Most recently, Lents has turned his research focus to the evolutionary genetics of human uniqueness. His laboratory recently discovered a set of microRNA genes on human chromosome 21 that are not shared with other apes and that appear to have originated de novo through genomic rearrangements.

== Books ==
In 2016, Lents published his first book, Not So Different: Finding Human Nature in Animals with Columbia University Press. The book received favorable reviews from Publishers Weekly, The Quarterly Review of Biology, Psychology Today, and several others. According to Lents, "…by exploring why animals behave as they do, we learn a lot about ourselves." He says the book is really about us, it only pretends to be about animals.

In 2018, Houghton Mifflin Harcourt published his second book, Human Errors: A Panorama of Our Glitches, from Pointless Bones to Broken Genes, which was listed by Publishers Weekly as a "Big Title" for spring 2018 in the Science category. Lents said his goal was to: "dispel two big misconceptions: that evolution produces perfection or anything like it, and that humans are the pinnacle of evolution." Lents explains that humans no longer need to rely on the body's physical ability because we learned to solve life's challenges by using our brains to invent tools and our social capabilities to allow for division of labor and cooperation. Human Errors received many favorable reviews and was included on recommended summer reading lists in The Wall Street Journal, Discover Magazine, EndPoints, the Financial Times, and was "Book of the Month" for August 2018 in Geographical Magazine.

In February 2025, HarperCollins published The Sexual Evolution: How 500 Million Years of Sex, Gender, and Mating Shape Modern Relationships., which recounts the evolution of sex, gender, sexuality, and sexual relationships in the animal world and analyzes how that history impacts sex and gender in human beings. Lents argues that human sexuality is "diverse, flexible, and adaptable", able to conform to the mandates of heteronormative power structures but not inherently monogamous. The book has received positive reviews from Newsweek, Publishers Weekly (starred review), Kirkus reviews, Science magazine, and was selected among the "best books of the year" by The New Yorker.

=== Intelligent Design criticism ===
Lents' book Human Errors elicited much criticism from supporters of Intelligent Design. Even though the book was intended for an audience that accepted the scientific consensus on evolution, it does argue that the quirks of evolution, not an intelligent designer, account for the flaws in the human body. Lents was thrust into the public eye as a defender of evolutionary science, especially in the context of education and politics in the United States. As part of this debate, Lents and a few colleagues deconstructed and rebutted a popular book on Intelligent Design, Darwin Devolves: The New Science About DNA That Challenges Evolution, written by creationist and biochemist Michael Behe. According to Lents, the exercise provided an opportunity both to clarify how evolution actually works and "how strongly bias can affect your interpretation of evidence". A version of this critique was published in the journal Science. Proponents of Intelligent Design reacted with a flurry of negative articles, but Lents responded to their arguments and personal attacks by keeping the discussion focused on the science.

== Science communication ==
Lents has had articles published in journals and magazines, including Newsweek Skeptic Magazine, The Wall Street Journal, The Observer, Psychology Today, and The Chronicle of Higher Education. He regularly contributes modules for the Visionlearning science education project. He also maintains The Human Evolution Blog and authors most of its content. He blogs for Psychology Today under the tagline "Beastly Behavior: How Evolution Shaped Our Minds and Bodies." He also reviews books for Science.

Lents previously hosted the This World of Humans podcast, a collaboration with the Visionlearning project, and was a featured presenter at CSIConin 2019 and 2022. As of 2022, Lents is a fellow with the Committee for Skeptical Inquiry.

== Media coverage ==
Lents has appeared on television, radio, and news articles commenting about forensic science, human evolution, and other science issues. His television appearances have included The Today Show, 48 Hours, The Whole Story with Anderson Cooper (CNN), Access Hollywood, The Brian Lehrer Show, BBC World Service Television, and Al Jazeera.

Lents's work has been quoted by various publications, including the Associated Press, Vice, The New York Times, Scientific American and others. His blog has been quoted by USA Today, the Daily Mirror, the Daily Mail, The Daily Telegraph, New York Magazine, the New York Post, IFL Science, People Magazine, and was mentioned on Live with Kelly and Ryan.

== Personal life ==
Lents and his husband Oscar live in Queens and have two children adopted from foster care. In an April 2020 article for Psychology Today, Lents chronicled his personal battle with COVID-19.
