= Immobilizer (disambiguation) =

An immobilizer is an electronic device fitted to an automobile which prevents the engine from running unless the correct key is present.

Immobilizer may also refer to:

- Immobilizer (chess), a piece used in Baroque chess
- "The Immobilizer", a 1985 television episode
- An alternative name for a medical splint

== See also ==
- Immobile (disambiguation)
- Immobilization (disambiguation)
- Immobilon
