= Brian David Dynlacht =

American biochemist (born 1965)

- Born: September 3, 1965; Brooklyn, New York, United States
- Education: Yale University; University of California, Berkeley
- Known for: Discovery of CP110; Identification of USP33
- Awards: Presidential Early Career Award for Scientists and Engineers; Kenneth G. and Elaine A. Langone Damon Runyon Scholar Award; Pew Scholar in the Biomedical Sciences; Irma T. Hirchl Trust Career Award
- Scientific career
- Fields: Biochemistry
- Workplaces: New York University Grossman School of Medicine
- Doctoral advisor: Robert Tjian
- Doctoral students: Nathan H. Lents

Brian David Dynlacht (born September 3, 1965), is an American biochemist and professor in the department of pathology of New York University Grossman School of Medicine at NYU Langone Health. Before moving his lab to New York University, he was an associate professor in the department of molecular and cellular biology at Harvard University. In 2002, while researching at the Harvard University, Dynlacht reported the discovery of CP110, which is now thought to be at the center of a molecular switch governing the centriole to ciliary transition in mammalian cells. His lab identified the first centriolar deubiquitinating enzyme, USP33, whose expression regulates centrosome biogenesis via deubiquitination of the centriolar protein CP110, and thus regulates the centrosome duplication.

== Early life and education ==
Brian David Dynlacht is the middle child of three children born to Sigmund (Zdzislaw) Dynlacht of Warsaw, Poland and Janice Deutsch of Brooklyn, New York. Dynlacht's father was orphaned during WWII and was a child survivor of the Holocaust. Dynlacht earned a Bachelor of Science in 1987 from Yale University, where he first conducted research under the mentorship of Paul Howard-Flanders. He was awarded a PhD in biochemistry in 1992 from the University of California at Berkeley. In 1991, as a graduate student with Robert Tjian, Dynlacht and Timothy Hoey reported for the first time the major protein components of TFIID. Dynlacht carried out postdoctoral studies with Ed Harlow at the Massachusetts General Hospital, where he definitively proved for the first time, in vitro using purified proteins, the biochemical mechanism through which transcription can be directly repressed by the Rb tumor suppressor protein. This study also provided the first example of an in vitro transcription system that responds to regulatory events acting upstream of the binding of a transactivator.

== Career ==
Dynlacht was appointed to the position of assistant professor in the department of molecular and cellular biology at Harvard University in 1995 and then associate professor in 1999. He is currently a professor in pathology in the Laura and Isaac Perlmutter Cancer Center of the New York University School of Medicine. At Harvard University, Dynlacht’s research was recognized by a Presidential Early Career Award for Scientists and Engineers in 1998. He has also received numerous career awards including Kenneth G. and Elaine A. Langone Damon Runyon Scholar Award (1996), Pew Scholar in the Biomedical Sciences (1998) and the Irma T. Hirchl Trust Career Award (2005).

== Notable trainees ==
Nathan H. Lents, postdoctoral fellow, scientist and author.

== External list ==
- Dynlacht's web site at NYU
- Center for Oral History. "Brian D. Dynlacht". Science History Institute.
- Van Benschoten, William (20 August 2004). Brian D. Dynlacht, Transcript of an Interview Conducted by William Van Benschoten at New York University New York City, New York on 19 and 20 August 2004 (PDF). Philadelphia, PA: Chemical Heritage Foundation.
