= Asticcacaulis =

Scientific classification
- Domain: Bacteria
- Kingdom: Pseudomonadati
- Phylum: Pseudomonadota
- Class: Alphaproteobacteria
- Order: Caulobacterales
- Family: Caulobacteraceae
- Genus: Asticcacaulis; Poindexter 1964

Species
- A. benevestitus A. biprosthecum A. endophyticus A. excentricus A. solisilvae A. taihuensis

Genus of bacteria

Image of bacteria; the middle and right most specimens both belong to Asticcacaulis

Asticcacaulis is a genus of bacteria.

== Etymology ==
The name Asticcacaulis derives from: Greek prefix a, not; Neo-Latin noun sticca, stick; Latin masculine gender noun caulis, stalk; Latin masculine gender noun Asticcacaulis, stalk that does not stick.
