= Robert Tjian =

Hong Kong-born American biochemist

- Born: 1949 (age 76–77); Hong Kong
- Education: University of California, Berkeley, Harvard University, Cold Spring Harbor Laboratory
- Awards: NAS Award in Molecular Biology (1991); Louisa Gross Horwitz Prize (1999); Alfred P. Sloan Jr. Prize (1999)
- Scientific career
- Workplaces: University of California, Berkeley, HHMI
- Doctoral advisor: Richard Losick
- Other academic advisors: Richard Losick, James D. Watson
- Doctoral students: Brian David Dynlacht

Robert Tse-Nan Tjian (Chinese: 錢澤南; pinyin: Qián Zénán; born 1949) is a Hong Kong-born American biochemist best known for his work on eukaryotic transcription. He is currently professor of biochemistry and molecular biology at the University of California, Berkeley and an Investigator of the Howard Hughes Medical Institute (HHMI). On April 1, 2009, Tjian became the President of HHMI. On August 4, 2015, he announced that he would step down as President at the end of 2016.

== Biography ==
Robert Tjian was born in Hong Kong in 1949. His father Tjian Tze-Ning (Qian Zining; 錢子寧), a native of Shaoxing, Zhejiang, was a famous capitalist in Shanghai and pioneer of China's modern paper industry. In April 1949, Tjian's family and business all moved to Hong Kong; in 1950 moved to São Paulo, Brazil; and later settled in New Jersey, the United States.

Tjian received a Bachelor of Arts degree from the University of California, Berkeley in 1971 and a Ph.D. degree from Harvard University in 1976. His Ph.D. thesis was entitled "Transcriptional Specificity Determinants of Bacillus subtilis RNA polymerase" and resulted from studies conducted in the laboratory of Richard Losick. He was a postdoctoral fellow at Cold Spring Harbor Laboratory with James D. Watson for three years before returning to the University of California in 1979 when he was appointed assistant professor of biochemistry. In 2008, Tjian joined the Board of Directors of the Lasker Foundation.

In 1978, Tjian demonstrated that the SV40 large T antigen was a viral-encoded sequence-specific DNA-binding regulatory protein that regulates gene expression in mammalian cells. He showed that "activator" proteins, which previously had been shown to play crucial roles in regulating gene expression in simple organisms, also exist in higher organisms. He and his colleagues further discovered several gene-regulatory proteins.

Tjian is also notable in drug-target studies and their applications. Tjian developed some highly efficient and sensitive techniques to detect cellular quantities such as proteins. In 1989, Tjian, together with two colleagues David Goeddel (father of MLB players Erik and Tyler Goeddel) and Steve McKnight, co-founded Tularik Inc., a biotechnology company based in South San Francisco, California. Tularik was acquired by Amgen for $1.3 billion in 2004.

In 2020, Tjian collaborated with Jennifer Doudna and other UC Berkeley colleagues on a response to the COVID-19 pandemic.

Tjian is also a member of the USA Science and Engineering Festival's Advisory Board.

== Awards and honors ==
- Elected to the American Philosophical Society (2009)
- Pfizer Award in Enzyme Chemistry (1983)
- Cancer Research Award, Milken Family Medical Foundation (1988)
- Elected to the Academia Sinica, Taiwan (1990)
- National Academy of Sciences Award for Molecular Biology (1991)
- Elected to the National Academy of Sciences (1991)
- California Scientist of the Year (1994)
- Lewis S. Rosenstiel Award for Distinguished Work in Basic Medical Science (1995)
- Passano Award (1995)
- Elected to the American Academy of Arts and Sciences (1997)
- Alfred P. Sloan Jr. Prize, from General Motors Cancer Research Foundation (1999)
- Louisa Gross Horwitz Prize (Columbia University) (1999)
- MERIT Award, from National Cancer Institute (2004)
- Grand Prix Charles-Leopold Mayer (2010)
- Glenn T. Seaborg Medal (2010)
- Fiat Lux Faculty Award from the University of California, Berkeley (2021)
