= Parvularcula =

Scientific classification
- Domain: Bacteria
- Kingdom: Pseudomonadati
- Phylum: Pseudomonadota
- Class: Alphaproteobacteria
- Order: Parvularculales
- Family: Parvularculaceae
- Genus: Parvularcula; Cho and Giovannoni, 2003

Species
- Parvularcula bermudensis Cho and Giovannoni 2003; Parvularcula dongshanensis Yu et al. 2013; Parvularcula flava Zhang et al. 2016; Parvularcula lutaonensis Arun et al. 2009; Parvularcula marina Sun et al. 2019; Parvularcula mediterranea Al-Omari et al. 2021; "Parvularcula oceani" corrig. Li et al. 2014

Genus of bacteria

Parvularcula is a genus of marine bacteria.
