= Howard Hughes Medical Institute =

American nonprofit organization

- Founded: 1953; 73 years ago
- Founder: Howard Hughes
- Location: Chevy Chase, Maryland, U.S.
- Coordinates: 38°59′55″N 77°4′47″W
- Method: Laboratories, Funding
- Fields: Biological and Medical research and Science Education
- Key people: Erin O'Shea (President)
- Revenue: -US$2.303 billion (due to losses on investments) (2022)
- Expenses: US$853 million (2022)
- Endowment: US$24 billion
- Employees: 2,300 (2022)
- Website: hhmi.org

The Howard Hughes Medical Institute (HHMI) is an American non-profit medical research organization headquartered in Chevy Chase, Maryland, with additional facilities in Ashburn, Virginia. It was founded in 1953 by Howard Hughes, an American business magnate, investor, record-setting pilot, engineer, film director, and philanthropist, known during his lifetime as one of the most financially successful individuals in the world. It is one of the largest private funding organizations for biological and medical research in the United States. HHMI spends about $1 million per HHMI Investigator per year, which amounts to annual investment in biomedical research of about $825 million.

The institute has an endowment of $22.6 billion, making it the second-wealthiest philanthropic organization in the United States and the second-best-endowed medical research foundation in the world. HHMI is the former owner of the Hughes Aircraft Company, an American aerospace firm that was divested to various firms over time.

== History ==
The institute was formed in 1953 in Miami, Florida, to fund basic research, including trying to understand, in Hughes's words, "the genesis of life itself." In the early days, it was generally viewed as a tax haven for Hughes's huge personal fortune. Hughes was HHMI's sole trustee and he transferred his stock of Hughes Aircraft to the institute, in effect turning the large defense contractor into a tax-exempt charity. For many years, the institute grappled with maintaining its non-profit status; the Internal Revenue Service challenged the "charitable" status that made it tax-exempt. Partly in response to such claims, it began in the late 1950s to fund investigators doing research, initially 47 at eight institutions; it remained a modest enterprise for several decades.

Hughes's internist, Verne Mason, who treated Hughes after his 1946 plane crash, was chairman of the institute's medical advisory committee. By 1975, Hughes was sole trustee of the Howard Hughes Medical Institute, which in turn owned all the stock of the Hughes Aircraft Company.

In 1969, United States Representative Wright Patman "complained that the Hughes foundation was a tax‐evasion device," noting that the institute spent only $5.7 million for its operations between 1954 and 1961, during which Hughes Aircraft accumulated $76.9 million in profits. By 1975, it had also avoided certain stipulations of the 1969 reform act for charitable institutions due to legal filings by Hughes to change its operational status, with his objections going directly to the White House.

The institute moved to Coconut Grove, Florida, in the mid-1970s and then to Bethesda, Maryland, in 1976.

In 1993, the institute moved to its headquarters in Chevy Chase, Maryland.

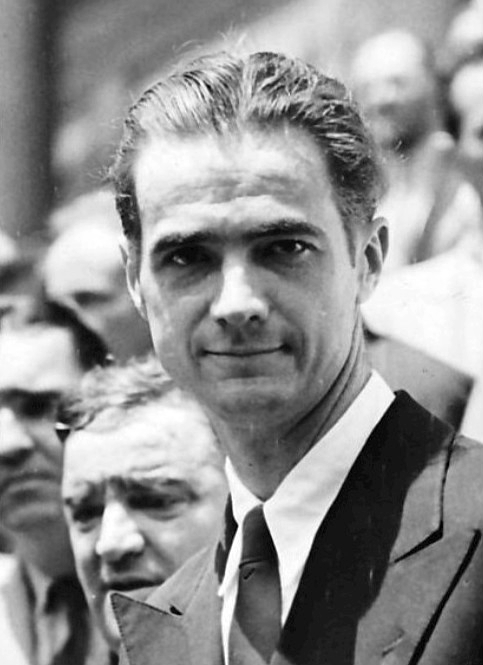
HHMI founder Howard Hughes

After Hughes's death in 1976, the institute's profile increased from an annual budget of $4 million in 1975 to $15 million in 1978. Before Hughes Aircraft was sold in 1985, the number had grown to $200 million per year. At the time of the sale Hughes Aircraft employed 75,000 people and vast amounts of the approximate annual revenue of $6 billion were put into Hughes Aircraft internal research and development rather than the medical institute. Most of the money for the medical institute came from the operations at Ground System Group responsible for providing Air Defense Systems to NATO, Pacific Rim, and the US. In this period it focused its mission on genetics, immunology, and molecular biology. Since Hughes died without a will as the sole trustee of the HHMI, the institute was involved in lengthy court proceedings to determine whether it would benefit from Hughes's fortune. In April 1984, a court appointed new trustees for the institute's holdings.

In January 1985 the trustees announced they would sell Hughes Aircraft by private sale or public stock offering. On June 5, 1985, General Motors (GM) was announced as the winner of a secretive five-month, sealed-bid auction. The purchase was completed on December 20, 1985, for an estimated $5.2 billion: $2.7 billion in cash plus 50 million shares of GM Class H stock. The proceeds caused the institute to grow dramatically.

HHMI completed the Janelia Research Campus in Ashburn, Virginia, in October 2006. It is modeled after AT&T's Bell Labs and the Medical Research Council's Laboratory of Molecular Biology. With a main laboratory building nearly 1,000 feet (300 m) long, it contains 760,000 square feet (71,000 m^{2}) of enclosed space, used primarily for research. The campus also has apartments for researchers.

In 2007, HHMI and the publisher Elsevier agreed to make author manuscripts of HHMI research articles published after September 1, 2007, in Elsevier and Cell Press journals publicly available six months after final publication.

In April 2009, the Trustees of the Howard Hughes Medical Institute selected Robert Tjian as its new president.

In 2009, HHMI awarded fifty researchers as part of the HHMI Early Career Scientist Competition.

In 2014, the institute created a new round of its primary award competition, for a total of $150 million in award money from 2012 to 2015. The institute is expanding the Ashburn campus in 2019.

In 2016, the HHMI trustees selected Erin K. O'Shea, a previous vice president and chief scientific officer at the institute, the new president of HHMI.

In 2022, HHMI began to require immediate open access to publications from its research.

In 2023, HHMI was sued by Vivian Cheung for disability discrimination. HHMI won the suit in Maryland State Court and Dr. Cheung appealed to the Maryland Appellate Court.

In 2025, HHMI cancelled their Inclusive Excellence 3 (IE3) program, which was a 6-year (2022–2028) $8.8 million award they had committed to the IMPACT STEM Network, which sought to improve undergraduate science education and research.

== Assets ==
As of 2017 the Howard Hughes Medical Institute had assets of $22,588,928,000.

=== Funding details ===
Funding details as of 2017:
Revenue and support as of 2017: $2,382,777,000
1. Interest, dividends, and other income from investments (8.10%)
2. Realized gains on investment and derivative contracts, net (52.7%)
3. Change in unrealized gains/(losses) of investments and derivative contracts (39.2%)
Expenses as of 2017: $936,514,000
1. Medical research (70.4%)
2. Science education and other scientific programs (12.8%)
3. General and administrative (9.80%)
4. Interest expense (7.00%)

== See also ==
- List of wealthiest charitable foundations
