= Visionlearning =

Visionlearning is a free, web-based resource for students and educators in the science, technology, engineering and mathematics (STEM) disciplines. Geared toward those studying at high school and undergraduate levels, Visionlearning takes advantage of recent advances in new media to provide students and educators with learning and teaching materials. Research by project personnel has shown that this peer-reviewed and bilingual content improves student understanding of science and facilitates multidisciplinary teaching. The project also strives to build community around improving STEM education.

Visionlearning is supported by the National Science Foundation and the U.S. Department of Education.

== History ==
In 1998, Dr. Anthony Carpi, an environmental chemist and then-assistant professor at John Jay College of the City University of New York, designed and launched a prototype called The Natural Science, an Internet learning resource for science students. This was in part of a response to the growing evidence that poor textbook content and deficient teaching materials contribute to inadequate science education. The purpose of the prototype was to identify whether if presenting important course information in a new form would improve what students understood, what information they remembered, and how well they performed in their class overall.

Through standardized exam scores and student retention data, this research showed that using the prototype has significantly improved science comprehension and performance in the targeted natural science course. Further evaluations also showed that the prototype helped to improve communication skills and student engagement with the course.

In response to the success of The Natural Science Pages prototype and with support of the NSF, Carpi developed the Visionlearning project, which brought on a group of scientists and educators to create content and became a website open to students and educators worldwide. In the last decade, Visionlearning has evolved into a more comprehensive website that provides free educational materials to support the science, technology, engineering, and mathematics (STEM) disciplines, with translations into Spanish. These materials include independent learning modules that focus on distinct topics within STEM disciplines, teaching resources, and MyClassroom tool (similar to Moodle or WebCT) that allows educators to customize and maintain a virtual learning environment for their students, and new media elements to benefit multiple learning styles. A key feature of all of Visionlearning’s material is an emphasis on the process of science and discovery.

== The Process of Science: A Philosophy for Teaching and Learning ==
Throughout the development of the learning modules and multimedia tools, Visionlearning has emphasized an importance on teaching science as a process, rather than “a simple set of facts and terms to be memorized.” This comes from an organizational ideology that understand how scientific knowledge evolves a better prepares for students to engage with the process of discovery and helps to dispel common misconceptions about science. The underlying notion is that students will develop independent, objective thinking skills regardless of whether they pursue a career in STEM disciplines, and understand that science is far more than simply conducting experiments in a lab and working with complex mathematical formulas.

== Content ==
As of 2009, Visionlearning has developed 70 independent learning modules in nine subject areas, including biology, chemistry, earth science, and the process of science. Scientist and author Nathan H. Lents has been a longtime contributor and module reviewer for Visionlearning and currently serves as life science editor. Visionlearning modules are organized into concise, relevant topic areas, grouped by discipline. Each module can be used independently, or in conjunction with others, and intentionally concentrates on core concepts to help direct learning. Supplementary materials such as quizzes, links to reviewed sources, and biographies are also provided for additional exploration. These modules are directed toward undergraduate and high school learning, and have been written by experts in the relevant disciplines. Every module is peer reviewed for quality and accuracy, and includes historical context and contemporary relevance.

== Position statements ==
Visionlearning does not subscribe to any political party or affiliation. The project is dedicated to providing impartial information in the STEM disciplines and encouraging learning in the process of science. One important goal of the project is to provide an understanding of scientific concepts while emphasizing how the scientific community has arrived at these conclusions. The intention is that, through teaching about the process of scientific discovery, students will look at science not as factual elements, but as a way of knowing about the world.

The project does not subscribe to the belief that the Internet and new media are replacing more traditional forms or communication, but through proper integration of all the technology available students will have a greater chance of success in STEM learning.
