= Immobilization =

Immobilization may refer to:

== Chemistry ==
- Enzyme immobilization, a concept in organic chemistry
- Immobilization (soil science), the absorption of decomposed organic matter by micro-organisms
- Whole cell immobilization, a biochemistry method

== Medicine ==
- Bed rest, medical treatment in which a person lies in bed for most of the time to try to cure an illness
- Immobilization (healing), holding an injured joint or bone in place with a splint, cast, or brace to prevent movement while healing
- Muscle immobilization or paralysis, the complete loss of muscle function for one or more muscle groups
- Trauma immobilization with spinal board designed to provide rigid support during movement of a person with suspected spinal or limb injuries
- Sedentary lifestyle, voluntary immobility in which one is physically inactive

== Other uses ==
- Automobile immobilization, for vehicle theft prevention
- Economic immobilization, a concept in financial economics

== See also ==
- Immobile (disambiguation)
- Immobilizer (disambiguation)
- Immobilon
