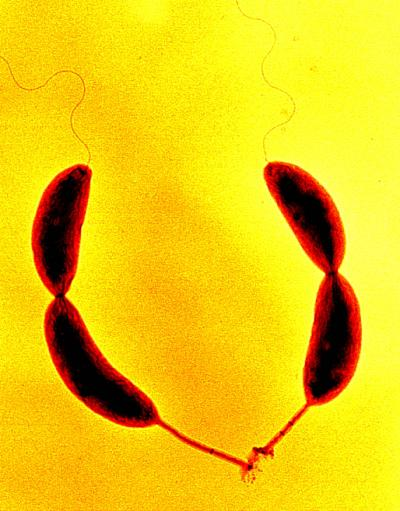
- Caulobacter crescentus

Scientific classification
- Domain: Bacteria
- Kingdom: Pseudomonadati
- Phylum: Pseudomonadota
- Class: Alphaproteobacteria
- Order: Caulobacterales
- Family: Caulobacteraceae
- Genus: Caulobacter; Poindexter 1964

Species
- C. crescentus C. daechungensis C. flavus C. fusiformis C. ginsengisoli C. heinricii C. hibisci C. inopinatus C. mirabilis C. mirare C. profundis C. radicis C. rhizosphaerae C. segnis C. zeae

= Caulobacter =

Genus of bacteria

Caulobacter is a genus of Gram-negative bacteria in the class Alphaproteobacteria. Its best-known member is Caulobacter crescentus, an organism ubiquitous in freshwater lakes and rivers; many members of the genus are specialized to oligotrophic environments.

== Interactions with other organisms ==
=== Pathogenicity ===
Although Caulobacter is not commonly appreciated as a cause of human diseases, Caulobacter isolates have been implicated in a number of cases of recurrent peritonitis in peritoneal dialysis patients. One study has identified the species C. crescentus and C. mirare as the cause of a disease of the moth Galleria mellonella; the absence of identified distinct virulence factors in C. mirare may suggest that other Caulobacter species have pathogenic potential.
