= Cannuli =

Cannuli is an Italian surname. Notable people with the surname include:

- Catherine Cannuli (born 1986), Australian soccer coach and player
- Thomas Cannuli (born 1992), American poker player
