= Harley McAdams =

American physicist and biologist

- Born: 1938 (age 87–88); Liberty, Texas
- Occupations: Professor of Developmental Biology; Microbial geneticist Physicist
- Spouse: Lucy Shapiro

Harley H. McAdams (born 1938, Liberty, Texas) is an American physicist, microbial geneticist, and developmental biologist. McAdams and his collaborators have published foundational insights on the nature of genetic regulatory logic and cell biology, the molecular basis for inevitable random variation levels of protein production between different cells, and genetic logic circuits that control the bacterial cell cycle. McAdams is married to Lucy Shapiro. They were jointly awarded the 2009 John Scott Medal for “bringing the methods of electrical circuit analysis to the description of genetic networks of the simple bacterium Caulobacter.”

McAdams, a professor emeritus in the Department of Developmental Biology in the Stanford University School of Medicine, holds undergraduate and graduate degrees in physics from Texas A&M University (BS), the University of Illinois (Urbana) (MS), and Rice University (MA, PhD). He is a fellow of the American Society for Microbiology.
