= Parvularculaceae =

Scientific classification
- Domain: Bacteria
- Kingdom: Pseudomonadati
- Phylum: Pseudomonadota
- Class: Alphaproteobacteria
- Order: "Parvularculales"; Garrity et al. 2003
- Family: "Parvularculaceae"; Garrity et al. 2003

Genera
- Amphiplicatus Zhang et al. 2014; Aquisalinus Zhong et al. 2016; Hyphococcus Sun et al. 2017; Marinicaulis Yu et al. 2018; Parvularcula Cho and Giovannoni 2003

Family of bacteria

The "Parvularculaceae" are a family of marine bacteria.
