= Tunku Putra School =

Tunku Putra School (now closed; reopened as Tunku Putra-HELP)

Location
- Samarahan Expressway, Tabuan Jaya; Kuching, Sarawak, 93350; Malaysia; 1.509759°N 110.397406°E

Information
- Type: Private National school International school
- Motto: Kita Boleh (We Can)
- Established: c. 1996
- Gender: Coeducational
- Age: 3 to 19
- Enrollment: Approximately 800+
- Hours in school day: 7
- Classrooms: 56
- Houses: Hawksbill Turtle; Rhinoceros Hornbill; Orangutan; Pangolin
- Colour: Navy blue
- Affiliation: Cahya Mata Sarawak Berhad, Help University
- Website: www.tphis.edu.my

Tunku Putra-Help International School (TPHIS) is a coeducational, private international school located on The NorthBank, Kuching - Samarahan Expressway, Tabuan Jaya, 9350 Kuching. Established in 1996, Tunku Putra School caters for children from the ages of 3+ years, enrolled in Kindergarten, National-stream or International-stream classes. The School is named after Tunku Abdul Rahman.

== 2026 incident ==
On 21 October 2026, a 16-year-old student allegedly injured a female teacher at Tunku Putra-HELP International School in Kuching, Sarawak, Malaysia. Police received an emergency call at approximately 8:03 a.m. local time. According to police, a small axe and a penknife were recovered in connection with the incident. The teacher sustained injuries to her hand and was taken to hospital for treatment. The student was arrested and subsequently released on police bail while investigations continued.

The school said that the teacher was recovering and had not sustained critical injuries. It also reported that students in the affected classroom had evacuated and that no other injuries had been reported. Classes ended early on the day of the incident as a precautionary measure, and the school subsequently announced plans to resume classes on 22 October.

Following the incident, the school announced enhanced security measures, including the deployment of three auxiliary police officers on campus and additional checks at entrances. The Sarawak State Education Department also stated that it was prepared to provide psychosocial support to affected students, teachers and staff. Police said the case was under investigation under Section 324 of the Penal Code and Section 6(1) of the Explosives Act 1957.

== Notable former pupils ==
- Kiyoshi Aihara — Hitz FM radio announcer
