= Cannula (archaea) =

Hollow structures which resemble tubes

Cannula (pl.: cannulae) is the term to describe hollow structures which resemble tubes that are only found in certain archaeal cells. Specifically identifying family members of the Pyrodictium genus, many examples have been examined from hydrothermal marine locations which harbor temperatures of 80-110 degrees Celsius. When observed in close proximity, cannula appear hollow. Unfortunately, the cannula are not well understood or studied.

== Physical structure ==
Cannula function as an intracellular connection of periplasmic spaces between differing cells. Although this is the physical function, the network function is still not clear. It has been hypothesized that this network connection might be used to exchange genetic material or nutrients, which could contribute to the cells' ability to survive unfavorable conditions. At present time, there is very little known about the inner working of the cannula tubule and what might happen there. When observed in close proximity, cannula appear hollow with a diameter of 25 nm that can grow up to 40 mm long. They have been found to be resistant to high heat conditions and many forms of denaturing agents. This has been proven by observing no morphological changes when subjected to high temperatures and sodium dodecyl sulfate.

The physical makeup of cannula are consistent with three different and homologous glycoprotein subunits that have different masses of 20, 22, and 24 kDa.

== Cannula expansion ==
It is found that the growth of these networks is directly related to cell division. When a cell of this type undergoes division, the two resulting daughter cells remain connected to their parental cell via these tubules, which exponentially grows the network structure with the division. This means that each cell has multiple cannula connections in a dense form.

== See also ==
- Hamus (archaea)
- Pilus
- Biofilm
