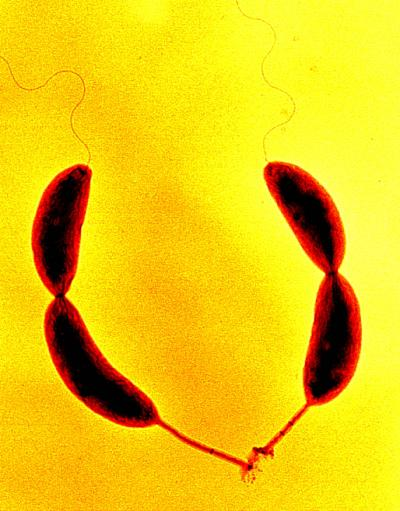
- Caulobacter crescentus

Scientific classification
- Domain: Bacteria
- Kingdom: Pseudomonadati
- Phylum: Pseudomonadota
- Class: Alphaproteobacteria
- Order: Caulobacterales
- Family: Caulobacteraceae; Henrici and Johnson 1935 (Approved Lists 1980)

Genera
- Aquidulcibacter Cai et al. 2018; Asticcacaulis Poindexter 1964 (Approved Lists 1980); Brevundimonas Segers et al. 1994; Caulobacter Henrici and Johnson 1935 (Approved Lists 1980); Phenylobacterium Lingens et al. 1985; Terricaulis Vieira et al. 2020

= Caulobacteraceae =

Family of bacteria

Caulobacteraceae is a family of Pseudomonadota within the alpha subgroup. Like all Pseudomonadota, the Caulobacteraceae are gram-negative. Caulobacteraceae includes the genera Asticcacaulis, Brevundimonas, Phenylobacterium and Caulobacter.

The type species Caulobacter gives its name also to the recently proposed subclass, the Caulobacteridae, which includes the orders Caulobacterales, Parvularculales, Hyphomicrobiales, Rhodobacterales, Rhodospirillales, Sneathiellales, Sphingomonadales, Kiloniellales, Kordiimonadales and controversially the Holosporales.
