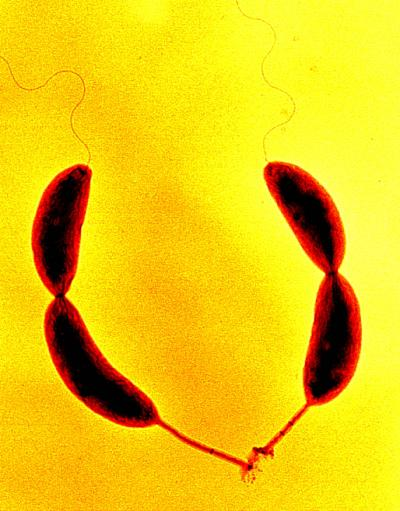
- Caulobacter crescentus

Scientific classification
- Domain: Bacteria
- Kingdom: Pseudomonadati
- Phylum: Pseudomonadota
- Class: Alphaproteobacteria
- Order: Caulobacterales; Henrici and Johnson 1935 (Approved Lists 1980)

Families
- Caulobacteraceae Henrici and Johnson 1935 (Approved Lists 1980); Hyphomonadaceae Lee et al. 2005; Maricaulaceae Kevbrin et al. 2021; Genera incertae sedis; "Chamaesiphonosira" Geitler 1975; "Hyphobacter" Nikitin et al. 1990

Synonyms
- Maricaulales Kevbrin et al. 2021; Hyphomonadales Kevbrin et al. 2021; "Candidatus Viadribacter manganicus" Braun and Szewzyk 2016

= Caulobacterales =

Family of bacteria

Caulobacterales is an order of gram-negative Pseudomonadota within the alpha subgroup.
