= MinC =

The MinC protein is one of three proteins in the Min system encoded by the minB operon and which is required to generate pole to pole oscillations prior to bacterial cell division as a means of specifying the midzone of the cell. This function is achieved by preventing the formation of the divisome Z-ring around the poles.

== History ==
When initially discovered in E. coli, MinC was believed to form a stable cap by binding with MinD at the bacterial caps in a stable and static manner, thereby specifying the mid-zone of the cell by lower-concentration or lack of this complex in that region, alleviating inhibition of Z-ring formation. However, Raskin & de Boer applied live-cell imaging with GFP fusion proteins to reveal a dynamic interaction of the Min proteins, demonstrating that MinC and MinD, with the essential help of MinE, actually rapidly oscillate between the two poles in a non-static manner. MinC is found in diverse genera, including Neisseria, Bacillus, and Synechocystis, but is absent in an equally wide assortment of genera (e.g. Caulobacter, Mycobacterium). Many bacteria that lack MinC carry alternative proteins that can position their Z-ring.

== Function ==
MinC is known to dimerize and functions as an FtsZ protein inhibitor, antagonizing its structural assembly when in a high enough concentration. The protein has the ability to disassemble the ZapA, ZapB and ZipA proteins which preferentially bind to the FtsZ scaffold protein and which are needed to initiate cell division. Concentrations of MinC are lowest at the mid-zone of bacterial cells, thereby permitting septum formation and scaffold assembly at the cellular mid-zone since the Min System proteins (MinCDE) are lowest in concentration in this region, alleviating the physical inhibition on the proteins required to initiate division.
