= Prokaryotic cytoskeleton =

Structural filaments in prokaryotes

Transmission electron micrograph of Uabimicrobium amorphum showing cytoskeletal fibres. Scale bars: 200 nm

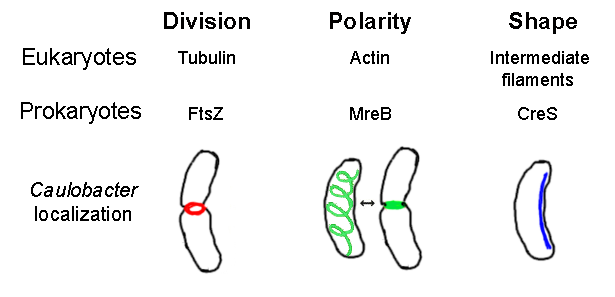
Elements of the Caulobacter crescentus cytoskeleton. The prokaryotic cytoskeletal elements are matched with their eukaryotic homologue and hypothesized cellular function.

The prokaryotic cytoskeleton is the collective name for all structural protein filaments in prokaryotes. Some of these proteins are analogues of those in eukaryotes, while others are unique to prokaryotes. Cytoskeletal elements play essential roles in cell division, protection, shape determination, and polarity determination in various prokaryotes.

== Tubulin superfamily ==
=== FtsZ ===
FtsZ, the first identified prokaryotic cytoskeletal element, forms a filamentous ring structure located in the middle of the cell called the Z-ring that constricts during cell division, similar to the actin-myosin contractile ring in eukaryotes. The Z-ring is a highly dynamic structure that consists of numerous bundles of protofilaments that extend and shrink, although the mechanism behind Z-ring contraction and the number of protofilaments involved are unclear. FtsZ acts as an organizer protein and is required for cell division. It is the first component of the septum during cytokinesis, and it recruits all other known cell division proteins to the division site.

Despite this functional similarity to actin, FtsZ is homologous to eukaryal tubulin. Although comparison of the primary structures of FtsZ and tubulin reveal a weak relationship, their 3-dimensional structures are remarkably similar. Furthermore, like tubulin, monomeric FtsZ is bound to GTP and polymerizes with other FtsZ monomers with the hydrolysis of GTP in a mechanism similar to tubulin dimerization. Since FtsZ is essential for cell division in bacteria, this protein is a target for the design of new antibiotics. There currently exist several models and mechanisms that regulate Z-ring formation, but these mechanisms depend on the species. Several rod shaped species, including Escherichia coli and Caulobacter crescentus, use one or more inhibitors of FtsZ assembly that form a bipolar gradient in the cell, enhancing polymerization of FtsZ at the cell center. One of these gradient-forming systems consists of MinCDE proteins (see below).

== Actin superfamily ==
=== MreB ===
MreB is a bacterial protein believed to be homologous to eukaryal actin. MreB and actin have a weak primary structure match, but are very similar in terms of 3-D structure and filament polymerization.

Almost all non-spherical bacteria rely on MreB to determine their shape. MreB assembles into a helical network of filamentous structures just under the cytoplasmic membrane, covering the whole length of the cell. MreB determines cell shape by mediating the position and activity of enzymes that synthesize peptidoglycan and by acting as a rigid filament under the cell membrane that exerts outward pressure to sculpt and bolster the cell. MreB condenses from its normal helical network and forms a tight ring at the septum in Caulobacter crescentus right before cell division, a mechanism that is believed to help locate its off-center septum. MreB is also important for polarity determination in polar bacteria, as it is responsible for the correct positioning of at least four different polar proteins in C. crescentus.

=== ParM and SopA ===
ParM is a cytoskeletal element that possesses a similar structure to actin, although it behaves functionally like tubulin. Further, it polymerizes bidirectionally and it exhibits dynamic instability, which are both behaviors characteristic of tubulin polymerization. It forms a system with ParR and parC that is responsible for R1 plasmid separation. ParM affixes to ParR, a DNA-binding protein that specifically binds to 10 direct repeats in the parC region on the R1 plasmid. This binding occurs on both ends of the ParM filament. This filament is then extended, separating the plasmids. The system is analogous to eukaryotic chromosome segregation as ParM acts like eukaryotic tubulin in the mitotic spindle, ParR acts like the kinetochore complex, and parC acts like the centromere of the chromosome.

F plasmid segregation occurs in a similar system where SopA acts as the cytoskeletal filament and SopB binds to the sopC sequence in the F plasmid, like the kinetochore and centromere respectively. Lately an actin-like ParM homolog has been found in a gram-positive bacterium Bacillus thuringiensis, which assembles into a microtubule-like structure and is involved in plasmid segregation.

=== Archaeal actin ===
Crenactin is an actin homologue unique to the archaeal phylum Thermoproteota (formerly "Crenarchaeota") that has been found in the order Thermoproteales and genus "Candidatus Korarchaeum." At the time of its discovery in 2009, it has the highest sequence similarity to eukaryotic actins of any known actin homologue. Crenactin has been well characterized in Pyryobaculum calidifontis (A3MWN5) and shown to have high specificity for ATP and GTP. Species containing crenactin are all rod or needle shaped. In P. calidifontis, crenactin has been shown to form helical structures that span the length of the cell, suggesting a role for crenactin in shape determination similar to that of MreB in other prokaryotes.

Even closer to the eukaryotic actin system is found in the archaeal kingdom Promethearchaeati. They use primitive versions of profilin, gelsolin, and cofilin to regulate the cytoskeleton.

== Unique groups ==
=== Crescentin ===
Crescentin (encoded by creS gene) is an analogue of eukaryotic intermediate filaments (IFs). Unlike the other analogous relationships discussed here, crescentin has a rather large primary homology with IF proteins in addition to three-dimensional similarity - the sequence of creS has a 25% identity match and 40% similarity to cytokeratin 19 and a 24% identity match and 40% similarity to nuclear lamin A. Furthermore, crescentin filaments are roughly 10 nm in diameter and thus fall within diameter range for eukaryal IFs (8-15 nm). Crescentin forms a continuous filament from pole to pole alongside the inner, concave side of the crescent-shaped bacterium Caulobacter crescentus. Both MreB and crescentin are necessary for C. crescentus to exist in its characteristic shape; it is believed that MreB molds the cell into a rod shape and crescentin bends this shape into a crescent.

=== MinCDE system ===
The MinCDE system is a filament system that properly positions the septum in the middle of the cell in Escherichia coli. According to Shih et al., MinC inhibits the formation of the septum by prohibiting the polymerization of the Z-ring. MinC, MinD, and MinE form a helix structure that winds around the cell and is bound to the membrane by MinD. The MinCDE helix occupies a pole and terminates in a filamentous structure called the E-ring made of MinE at the middle-most edge of the polar zone. From this configuration, the E-ring will contract and move toward that pole, disassembling the MinCDE helix as it moves along. Concomitantly, the disassembled fragments will reassemble at the opposite polar end, reforming the MinCDE coil on the opposite pole while the current MinCDE helix is broken down. This process then repeats, with the MinCDE helix oscillating from pole to pole. This oscillation occurs repeatedly during the cell cycle, thereby keeping MinC (and its septum inhibiting effect) at a lower time-averaged concentration at the middle of the cell than at the ends of the cell.

The dynamic behavior of the Min proteins has been reconstituted in vitro using an artificial lipid bilayer as mimic for the cell membrane. MinE and MinD self-organized into parallel and spiral protein waves by a reaction-diffusion like mechanism.

=== Bactofilin ===
Bactofilin (InterPro: IPR007607) is a β-helical cytoskeletal element that forms filaments throughout the cells of the rod-shaped proteobacterium Myxococcus xanthus. The bactofilin protein, BacM, is required for proper cell shape maintenance and cell wall integrity. M. xanthus cells lacking BacM have a deformed morphology characterized by a bent cell body, and bacM mutants have decreased resistance to antibiotics targeting the bacterial cell wall. M. xanthus BacM protein is cleaved from its full-length form to allow polymerization. Bactofilins have been implicated in cell shape regulation in other bacteria, including curvature of Proteus mirabilis cells, stalk formation by Caulobacter crescentus, and helical shape of Helicobacter pylori.

== See also ==
- Cyanobacterial morphology
