= Segrosome =

Protein complex

Segrosomes are protein complexes that ensure accurate segregation (partitioning) of plasmids or chromosomes during bacterial cell division.

Just as higher forms of life have evolved a complex mitotic apparatus to partition duplicated DNA during cell division, bacteria require a specialized apparatus to partition their duplicated DNA. In bacteria, segrosomes perform the function similar to that performed by mitotic spindle. Therefore, segrosomes can be thought of as minimalist spindles.

Segrosomes are usually composed of three basic components- the DNA (plasmid or chromosome) that needs to be segregated into daughter cells, a motor protein that provides the necessary physical forces for accomplishing the segregation and a DNA binding protein that connects the DNA and the motor protein, to form the complete segrosome complex.

== Motor proteins present in bacterial segrosomal complexes ==
The majority of motor proteins participating in plasmid segrosomes are Walker-type or ParM type ATPases. Segrosome formation could be a highly regulated and ordered process to ensure its coupling with the other events of the bacterial cell cycle. Recently segrosomal complexes derived from the tubulin family of cytoskeletal proteins, which are GTPases have been discovered in megaplasmids found in Bacillus species.

== See also ==
- Plasmid
- Bacteria
- FtsZ
- Tubulin
