= FtsK =

Protein involved in bacterial cell division

FtsK alpha domain

Identifiers
- Symbol: FtsK_alpha
- Pfam: PF17854
- InterPro: IPR041027
- CATH: 2j5o
- SCOP2: 2j5o / SCOPe / SUPFAM
- CDD: 407717
Available protein structures:
- PDB: IPR041027 PF17854 (ECOD; PDBsum)
- AlphaFold: IPR041027; PF17854

FtsK alpha domain
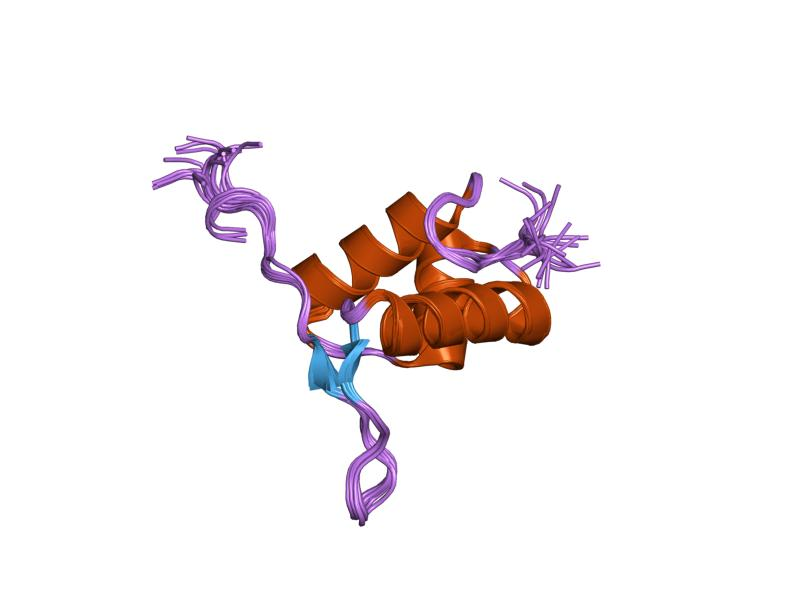
- Molecular Structure of FtsK (PDB 2j5o).

Identifiers
- Organism: Escherichia coli
- Symbol: ftsK_alpha
- UniProt: P46889
Search for
- Structures: Swiss-model
- Domains: InterPro

FtsK is a protein involved in bacterial cell division and chromosome segregation. In E. coli, is one of the largest proteins, consisting of 1329 amino acids. FtsK stands for "Filament temperature sensitive mutant K" because cells expressing a mutant ftsK allele called ftsK44, which encodes an FtsK variant containing an G80A residue change in the second transmembrane segment, fail to divide at high temperatures and form long filaments instead. FtsK, specifically its C-terminal domain, functions as a DNA translocase, interacts with other cell division proteins, and regulates Xer-mediated recombination. FtsK belongs to the AAA (ATPase Associated with various cellular Activities) superfamily and is present in most bacteria.

== Structure ==
FtsK is a transmembrane protein composed of three domains: FtsK_{N}, FtsK_{L}, and FtsK_{C}. FtsK functions to coordinate cell division and chromosome segregation through its N-terminal and C-terminal domains. The FtsK_{N} domain is embedded in the cytoplasmic membrane by four transmembrane α-helices. The FtsK_{L} domain extends from the membrane into the cytoplasm. This linking domain varies in length across many bacteria. Found at the cytoplasmic end of the linker domain, the FtsK_{C} segment of the protein is responsible for enabling the activity of the Xer recombination system upon the formation of a chromosome dimer.

Additionally, the FtsK_{C} domain is composed of three subdomains: α, β, and γ. The α and β subunits aggregate to form a hexamer that possesses the ability to translocate DNA through ATP hydrolysis. The ATP hydrolysis sites are found on the β subunits of the hexamer. The γ domain is responsible for the control of the hexamer. It mediates the attachment of the hexamer to double-stranded DNA, controls the directionality of the translocase, and initiates chromosome dimer segregation.

== Mechanism of action ==
=== The dif site ===
The dif site is found at the intersection between the monomers of the chromosome dimer. It corresponds to where chromosomal replication ceased and is also the site of Xer mediated segregation. Translocation of the FtsK_{C} hexamer stops when it reaches the location of the Xer recombinase complex that is associated with the dif site.

=== Binding site ===
Guanosine rich areas of DNA, which are found at the ends of the dif region, are the sites of translocation initiation. These sites are referred to as KOPS motifs. Upon binding a KOPS motif, the FtsK hexamer forms and proceeds towards the dif region. Movement toward the dif region is facilitated by the polarity of the KOPS motif.

=== Translocation ===
There are three proposed mechanisms of DNA translocation: the rotary inchworm, the staircase, and the revolution mechanism. The rotary inchworm mechanism involves two points of contact between DNA and the subunits of the FtsK_{C} hexamer. These points of contact correspond to an α and a β domain. A conformational change in the α subunit can cause the DNA to shift. This shift is followed by a conformational change in the β subunit (which also causes the DNA to move). The repeated conformational changes lead to the translocation of DNA.

Conversely, the staircase mechanism sees the α and β subunits of the hexamer interacting with the double-stranded DNA in a sequential and overlapping manner. Conformational changes in each subunit cause movement in the spatial position of the DNA strand. Additionally, the revolution mechanism entails the passing of DNA through a channel formed by the hexameric FtsK_{C} domain. In general, the chromosome dimer is translocated so that the site of resolution is near the divisome and so one copy of the genetic material ends up in each daughter cell. FtsK is the fastest DNA translocation pump, with rates of up to 7 kb s^{−1} it is also a very efficient one.

=== Recombinase (Xer D) activation ===
During bacterial replication, in the presence of a dimer the XerCD mechanism is introduced to divide the dimer into two monomers. FtsK is responsible for the activity of the Xer recombination reaction. Specifically, FtsK_{c} is summoned if a chromosome dimer is present at the mid-cell point. The Xer mechanism is activated by overexpression of FtsK, therefore it appears that FtsK activates the Xer recombination. FtsK turns on the activity of XerCD upon expenditure of ATP.

The recombination apparatus is made up of four monomers, two being Xer D and two being Xer C, that belong to a family of tyrosine recombinases. The interaction of Xer D and the γ subunit of FtsK_{C} results in the activation of the recombinase. Contact between Xer D and the γ subunit is facilitated by the translocation of DNA. Specifically, translocation stops when the FtsK_{c} hexamer reaches the dif site.

== Role in cell division ==
FtsK is a part of the divisome of bacteria and coordinates cell division with the resolution of chromosome dimers. FtsK_{N} stabilizes the septum and aids in the recruitment of other proteins to the site of cell division. The N-terminal 220 residues of FtsK are sufficient to promote cell division in Escherichia coli. However, additional evidence suggests that the N terminus is not the only part of FtsK that is involved in cell division. In an experiment done by Dubarry, a suppressor mutation allowed the cells to survive without FtsK_{N}. When segments of the FtsK cytoplasmic linker domain were fused to other divisome proteins that can attach to the membrane, such as FtsW, only those fusions that contained the FtsK linker region were able to restore normal cell growth, providing convincing evidence that the linker region of FtsK plays an important role in cell division. Other studies have shown that part of the FtsK_{N} domain (which is in the periplasm) is involved in the construction of the cell wall.

== Phylogeny ==
FtsK is a member of the AAA motor ATPases. The phylogenetic tree of FtsK originates at the divergence between ssDNA and dsDNA translocases where TraB, FtsK, T4CPs and VirB4s arose. Each of these show structural similarities and the parent branch of FtsK arose along with other branches of TraB, TcpA, and FtsK. Although FtsK has its own phylogeny and branches within, TraB is similar to a sister protein branch that can be traced back to the timeline of FtsK. A common protein that derives from one of the phylogenetic branches of FtsK is SpoIIIE, which is essential for chromosome segregation in some Gram positive bacteria. FtsK is found in most bacteria including E. coli, Staphyloccus, and Streptomycetes and in certain Archaea, where the phylogenetic tree is similar to that of bacteria. FtsK family proteins have divergent branch lengths, making it difficult to provide an exact evolutionary timeline. The phylogeny of FtsK can therefore be compared to the time that protein groups VirB4/VirD4 diversified, and slightly earlier than TraB and TcpA as they only occur in Actinomycetota and Bacillota.

== See also ==
- FtsZ – Protein encoded by the ftsZ gene
- FtsA – Bacterial protein that is related to actin
