= Parm =

Parm or PARM may refer to:

- Parmesan cheese, especially in dishes such as chicken parm
- PARM 1 mine, Panzer-Abwehr Richtmine (German, Antitank defense arranging mine)
- Authentic Party of the Mexican Revolution, Partido Auténtico de la Revolución Mexicana (Spanish)
- ParM, a component of the segregation mechanism for the bacterial R1 plasmid
- parm AG, a Swiss software and consulting company
- Persistent Anti-Radiation Missile, an acronym commonly associated with the AGM-136A Tacit Rainbow cruise missile
