= Crescentin =

Bacterial cytoskeletal protein

Identifiers
- Symbol: Crescentin
- Pfam: PF19220
- InterPro: IPR043652
Available protein structures:
- PDB: IPR043652 PF19220 (ECOD; PDBsum)
- AlphaFold: IPR043652; PF19220

Intermediate filament-like cell shape determinant CreS

Identifiers
- Organism: Caulobacter vibrioides
- Symbol: CreS
- Alt. symbols: ParA
- Orthologs: OMA: entry
- UniProt: Q6IET3
Search for
- Structures: Swiss-model
- Domains: InterPro

Crescentin is a protein which is a bacterial relative of the intermediate filaments found in eukaryotic cells. Just as tubulins and actins – the other major cytoskeletal proteins – have prokaryotic homologs in, respectively, the FtsZ and MreB proteins, intermediate filaments are linked to the crescentin protein. Some of its homologs are erroneously labelled Chromosome segregation protein ParA. This protein family is found in Caulobacter and Methylobacterium.

== Role in cell shape ==
Crescentin was discovered in 2009 by Christine Jacobs-Wagner in Caulobacter crescentus (now vibrioides), an aquatic bacterium which uses its crescent-shaped cells for enhanced motility. The crescentin protein is located on the concave face of these cells and appears to be necessary for their shape, as mutants lacking the protein form rod-shaped cells. To influence the shape of the Caulobacter cells, the helices of crescentin filaments associate with the cytoplasmic side of the cell membrane on one lateral side of the cell. This induces a curved cell shape in younger cells, which are shorter than the helical pitch of crescentin, but induces a spiral shape in older, longer cells.

== Protein structure ==
Like eukaryotic intermediate filaments, crescentin organizes into filaments and is present in a helical structure in the cell. Crescentin is necessary for both shapes of the Caulobacter prokaryote (vibroid/crescent-shape and helical shape, which it may adopt after a long stationary phase). The crescentin protein has 430 residues; its sequence mostly consists of a pattern of 7 repeated residues which form a coiled-coil structure. The DNA sequence of the protein has sections very similar to the eukaryotic keratin and lamin proteins, mostly involving the coiled-coil structure. Ausmees et al. (2003) proved that, like animal intermediate filament proteins, crescentin has a central rod made up of four coiled-coil segments. Both intermediate filament and crescentin proteins have a primary sequence including four α-helical segments along with non-α-helical linker domains. An important difference between crescentin and animal intermediate filament proteins is that crescentin lacks certain consensus sequence elements at the ends of the rod domain which are conserved in animal lamin and keratin proteins.

The protein has been divided into a few subdomains organized similarly to eukaryotic IF proteins. Not every researcher is convinced that it is a homolog of intermediate filaments, suggesting instead that the similarity might have arisen via convergent evolution. (Indeed, the Cryo-EM structure of CreS does not display the proposed eukaryotic-like interruption in the rod; see next paragraph.)

A number of Cryo-EM structures of crescentin were published in late 2023. The researchers used a nanobody that tags onto one specific part of the filament, so that it's easier to tell where each unit of the filament begins and ends. Two chains of the crescentin molecule pair together into a dimeric coil. Two coils come together side-by-side into a strand. Each strand is paired at its head and tail by another strand, so that it continues like a chain. Two chains of strands pair together side-by-side into a filament. Like eukaryotic intermediate filaments, the CreS filament is octameric and lacks overall polarity. However, CreS does not show a linker domain in the middle but instead presents as a continuous rod.

== Assembly of filaments ==
Eukaryotic intermediate filament proteins assemble into filaments of 8–15 nm within the cell without the need for energy input, that is, no need for ATP or GTP. Ausmees et al. continued their crescentin research by testing whether the protein could assemble into filaments in this manner in vitro. They found that crescentin proteins were indeed able to form filaments about 10 nm wide, and that some of these filaments organized laterally into bundles, just as eukaryotic intermediate filaments do. The similarity of crescentin protein to intermediate filament proteins suggests an evolutionary linkage between these two cytoskeletal proteins.

Like eukaryotic intermediate filaments, the filament built from crescentin is elastic. Individual proteins dissociate slowly, making the structure somewhat stiff and slow to remodel. Strain does not induce hardening of the structure, unlike eukaryotic IFs that do.
