= A22 (antibiotic) =

Names
- Preferred IUPAC name (3,4-Dichlorophenyl)methyl carbamimidothioate
- Other names 3,4-Dichlorobenzyl carbamimidothioate

Identifiers
CAS Number	22297-13-8
3D model (JSmol)	Interactive image
ChEMBL	ChEMBL1229059
ChemSpider	309312
PubChem CID	348494
UNII	J9ZA892FYX
CompTox Dashboard (EPA)	DTXSID10324845
- InChI: InChI=1S/C8H8Cl2N2S/c9-6-2-1-5(3-7(6)10)4-13-8(11)12/h1-3H,4H2,(H3,11,12) Key: LZTCFLDZLBOLDW-UHFFFAOYSA-N
- SMILES: C1=CC(=C(C=C1CSC(=N)N)Cl)Cl

Properties
Chemical formula	C_{8}H_{8}Cl_{2}N_{2}S
Molar mass	235.13 g·mol^{−1}
- Except where otherwise noted, data are given for materials in their standard state (at 25 °C [77 °F], 100 kPa). Infobox references

A22, also known as S-(3,4-dichlorobenzyl) isothiourea, is a chemical compound with antibiotic activity. It is colorless, hygroscopic, and light-sensitive.

== Antibiotic activity ==
A22 acts as a reversible inhibitor of the bacterial cell wall protein MreB, causing bacterial rod-shaped cells to form coccoid cells. The antibiotic activity of A22 has been studied primarily in Pseudomonas aeruginosa. However, A22 does not seem to be useful as an antibiotic in humans due to its cytotoxic and genotoxic effects on human peripheral blood mononuclear cells (PBMCs).

== A22 as a research tool ==
Despite its cytotoxic effects in human cells, A22 has been used as a research tool to investigate the bacterial cytoskeleton. A22 binds directly to the actin homolog MreB in its nucleotide-binding pocket, blocking simultaneous ATP binding. As a consequence, A22 inhibits MreB polymerization and thus disrupts the cytoskeleton of bacteria, causing defects of morphology and chromosome segregation.
