= CopA-like RNA =

Family of non-coding RNAs found on the R1 pyramid

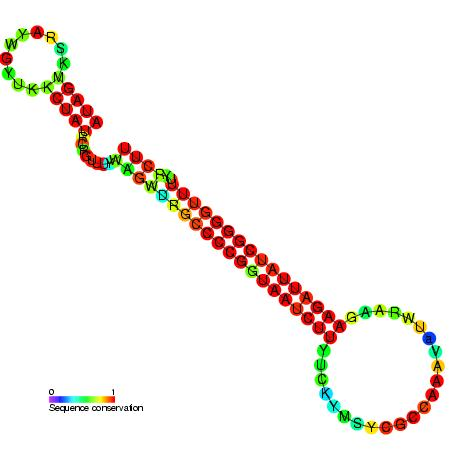
- Predicted secondary structure and sequence conservation of CopA

Identifiers
- Symbol: CopA
- Rfam: RF00042

Other data
- RNA type: Gene; antisense
- Domain(s): Bacteria
- SO: SO:0000644
- PDB structures: PDBe

CopA-like RNA is a family of non-coding RNAs found on the R1 plasmid.

In several groups of bacterial plasmids, antisense RNAs regulate copy number through inhibition of replication initiator protein synthesis. These RNAs are characterised by a long hairpin structure interrupted by several unpaired nucleotides or bulged loops. In plasmid R1, the inhibitory complex between the antisense RNA (CopA) and its target mRNA (CopT) is characterised by a four-way junction structure and a side-by-side helical alignment.

== See also ==
Plasmid-mediated resistance (sRNA section)
