= MinD =

The MinD protein is one of three proteins encoded by the minB operon and also a part of the ParA family of ATPases. It is required to generate pole to pole oscillations prior to bacterial cell division as a means of specifying the midzone of the cell. It is a peripheral membrane ATPase involved in plasmid partitioning.

== History ==
When first discovered in E. coli, MinD was thought to associate with MinC and form a stable cap at each bacterial pole, thereby specifying the mid-zone of the cell by alleviating inhibitory pressures in that region. Through the use of live-cell imaging with GFP fusion proteins, Raskin and de Boer revealed a dynamic interaction of the Min proteins, demonstrating that MinC and MinD instead rapidly oscillate between the two poles in a non-static manner.

== Function ==
The ATPase activity of MinD is activated by MinE while in the presence of phospholipids, suggesting that the binding to the membrane induces a conformational change allowing it to become susceptible to MinE activation. MinD activity is dependent on local MinD concentration, suggesting an oligomerization process and cooperativity.

=== In vitro studies ===
In vitro studies of the Min system are done on a two dimensional supporting lipid bilayer. Fluorescent labelling of MinD has revealed that it tends to form a membrane-bound carpet in MinE mutants (ATP cannot be limiting). Upon re-addition of MinE, the system becomes unstable and dynamic. Localized foci of increased MinE concentration result in subsequent MinD membrane detachment and through several iterations of this attachment and detachment process, the emergence of standing waves was observed. This process is indicative of the Min system’s ability to self-organize. Fluorescence studies reveal the formation of a focused wave-front.

Single molecule dynamics revealed that MinD dimerizes while membrane-bound, resulting in a stronger membrane association at the rear of the standing wave and giving rise to a diffusivity gradient. This observation explains the presence of focused bands of fluorescence in these standing wave studies.

Additional study of this system and its interacting molecular partners is required to fully characterize the min system and to understand the molecular dynamics.
