= Plasmid-mediated resistance =

Antibiotic resistance caused by a plasmid

An example plasmid with two areas of antibiotic resistance coding DNA (1,2) and an origin of replication (3).

Plasmid-mediated resistance is the transfer of antibiotic resistance genes which are carried on plasmids. Plasmids possess mechanisms that ensure their independent replication as well as those that regulate their replication number and guarantee stable inheritance during cell division. By the conjugation process, they can stimulate lateral transfer between bacteria from various genera and kingdoms. Numerous plasmids contain addiction-inducing systems that are typically based on toxin-antitoxin factors and capable of killing daughter cells that don't inherit the plasmid during cell division. Plasmids often carry multiple antibiotic resistance genes, contributing to the spread of multidrug-resistance (MDR). Antibiotic resistance mediated by MDR plasmids severely limits the treatment options for the infections caused by Gram-negative bacteria, especially family Enterobacteriaceae. The global spread of MDR plasmids has been enhanced by selective pressure from antimicrobial medications used in medical facilities and when raising animals for food.

== Properties of resistance plasmids ==
Resistance plasmids by definition carry one or more antibiotic resistance genes. They are frequently accompanied by the genes encoding virulence determinants, specific enzymes or resistance to toxic heavy metals. Multiple resistance genes are commonly arranged in the resistance cassettes. The antibiotic resistance genes found on the plasmids confer resistance to most of the antibiotic classes used nowadays, for example, beta-lactams, fluoroquinolones and aminoglycosides.

It is very common for the resistance genes or entire resistance cassettes to be re-arranged on the same plasmid or be moved to a different plasmid or chromosome by means of recombination systems. Examples of such systems include integrons, transposons, and ISCR-promoted gene mobilization.

Most of the resistance plasmids are conjugative, meaning that they encode all the needed components for the transfer of the plasmid to another bacterium, and that isn't present in mobilizable plasmids. According to that, Mobilizable plasmids are smaller in size (usually < 10 kb) while conjugative plasmids are larger (usually > 30 kb) due to the considerable size of DNA required to encode the conjugation mechanisms that allow for cell-to-cell conjugation.

== R-factor ==
R-factors are also called resistance factors or resistance plasmids. They are tiny, circular DNA elements that are self-replicating and contain antibiotic resistance genes. They were first found in Japan in 1959 when it was discovered that some Shigella strains had developed resistance to a number of antibiotics used to treat a dysentery epidemic. Shigella is a genus of Gram-negative, aerobic, non-spore-forming, non-motile, rod-shaped bacteria. Resistance genes are ones that give rise to proteins that modify the antibiotic or pump it out. They are different from mutations that give bacteria resistance to antibiotics by preventing the antibiotic from getting in or changing the shape of the target protein. R-factors have been known to contain up to ten resistance genes. They can also spread easily as they contain genes for constructing pili, which allow them to transfer the R-factor to other bacteria. R-factors have contributed to the growing antibiotic resistance crisis because they quickly spread resistance genes among bacteria. The R factor by itself cannot be transmitted.

=== Structure of Resistance Plasmids ===
The majority of the R-RTF (Resistance Transfer Factor) genes are found in the R-factor (resistance plasmid), which can be conceptualized as a circular piece of DNA with a length of 80 to 95 kb. This plasmid shares many genes with the F factor and is largely homologous to it. Additionally, it has a fin 0 gene that inhibits the transfer operon's functionality. The size and number of drug resistance genes in each R factor varies. For example, the RTF is bigger than the R determinant. An IS 1 element separates the RTF and R determinant on either side before they combine into a single unit. The IS 1 components simplify it for R determinants to be transferred between different R-RTF unit types.

=== Functions of Resistance Plasmids ===
- They play a role in the autonomous replication, conjugation, and ampicillin resistance genes.
- Genes in the resistance plasmids enable bacteria to produce pili and develop resistance to antibiotics.
- MDR genes in bacteria are transmitted mainly through the resistance plasmids.

== Transmission ==
Bacteria containing F-factors (said to be "F+") have the capability for horizontal gene transfer; they can construct a sex pilus, which emerges from the donor bacterium and ensnares the recipient bacterium, draws it in, and eventually triggers the formation of a mating bridge, merging the cytoplasms of two bacteria via a controlled pore. This pore allows the transfer of genetic material, such as a plasmid. Conjugation allows two bacteria, not necessarily from the same species, to transfer genetic material one way. Since many F+ bacteria contain R-factors, antibiotic resistance can be easily spread among a population of bacteria. Also, R-factors can be taken up by "DNA pumps" in their membranes via transformation, or less commonly through viral-mediated transduction via bacteriophages; however, conjugation is the most common means of antibiotic resistance spread. They contain the gene called RTF (Resistance transfer factor).

== Enterobacteriaceae ==
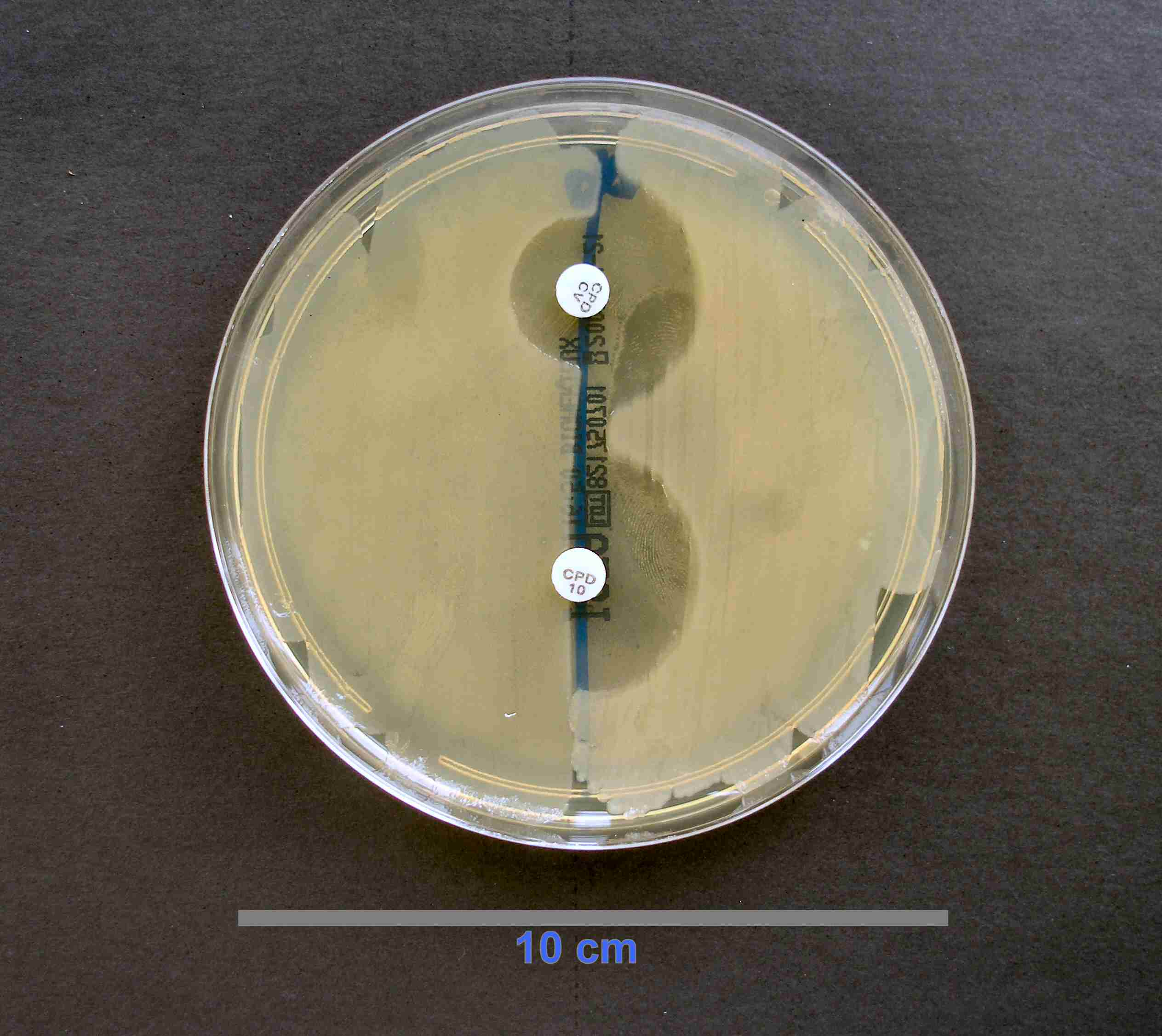
Escherichia coli bacteria on the right are sensitive to two beta-lactam antibiotics, and do not grow in the semi-circular regions surrounding the antibiotics. E. coli bacteria on the left are resistant to beta-lactam antibiotics, and grow next to one antibiotic (bottom) and are less inhibited by another antibiotic (top).

it is a family of Gram-negative rod-shaped (bacilli) bacteria, the pathogenic bacteria that are most frequently found in the environment and clinical cases, as a result, they are significantly impacted by the use of antibiotics in agriculture, the ecosystem, or the treatment of diseases. In Enterobacteriaceae, 28 different plasmid types can be identified by PCR-based replicon typing (PBRT).The plasmids that have been frequently reported [IncF, IncI, IncA/C, IncL (previously designated IncL/M), IncN, and IncH] contain a broad variety of resistance genes.

Members of family Enterobacteriaceae, for example, Escherichia coli or Klebsiella pneumoniae pose the biggest threat regarding plasmid-mediated resistance in hospital- and community-acquired infections.

=== Beta-lactam resistance ===
B-lactamases are antibiotic-hydrolyzing enzymes that typically cause resistance to b-lactam antibiotics. These enzymes are prevalent in Streptomyces, and together with related enzymes discovered in pathogenic and non-pathogenic bacteria, they form the protein family known as the "b-lactamase superfamily". it is hypothesized that b-lactamases also serve a double purpose, such as housekeeping and antibiotic resistance.

Both narrow spectrum beta-lactamases (e.g. penicillinases) and extended spectrum beta-lactamases (ESBL) are common for resistance plasmids in Enterobacteriaceae. Often multiple beta-lactamase genes are found on the same plasmid hydrolyzing a wide spectrum of beta-lactam antibiotics.

==== Extended spectrum beta-lactamases (ESBL) ====
ESBL enzymes can hydrolyze all beta-lactam antibiotics, including cephalosporins, except for the carpabepenems. The first clinically observed ESBL enzymes were mutated versions of the narrow spectrum beta-lactamases, like TEM and SHV. Other ESBL enzymes originate outside of family Enterobacteriaceae, but have been spreading as well.

In addition, since the plasmids that carry ESBL genes also commonly encode resistance determinants for many other antibiotics, ESBL strains are often resistant to many non-beta-lactam antibiotics as well, leaving very few options for the treatment.

==== Carbapenemases ====
Carbapenemases represent type of ESBL which are able to hydrolyze carbapenem antibiotics that are considered as the last-resort treatment for ESBL-producing bacteria. KPC, NDM-1, VIM and OXA-48 carbapenemases have been increasingly reported worldwide as causes of hospital-acquired infections.

=== Quinolone resistance ===
Several studies have shown that fluoroquinolone resistance has enhanced worldwide, especially in Enterobacteriaceae members. QnrA was the first known plasmid-mediated gene associated in quinolone resistance. Quinolone resistance genes are frequently located on the same plasmid as the ESBL genes. The proteins known as QnrS, QnrB, QnrC, and QnrD are four others that are similar. Numerous variants have been found for qnrA, qnrS, and qnrB, and they are distinguished by sequential numbers. The qnr genes can be discovered in integrons and transposons on MDR plasmids of various incompatibility groups, which could carry a number of resistance-related molecules, such as carbapenemases and ESBLs. Examples of resistance mechanisms include different Qnr proteins, aminoglycose acetyltransferase aac(6')-Ib-cr that is able to hydrolyze ciprofloxacin and norfloxacin, as well as efflux transporters OqxAB and QepA.

=== Aminoglycoside resistance ===
xResistance to aminoglycosides in Gram-negative pathogens is primarily caused by enzymes that acetylate, adenylate, or phosphorylate the medication. On mobile elements, such as plasmids, are the genes that encode these enzymes.Aminoglycoside resistance genes are also commonly found together with ESBL genes. Resistance to aminoglycosides is conferred via numerous aminoglycoside-modifying enzymes and 16S rRNA methyltransferases. Resistance to aminoglycosides is conferred via numerous mechanisms:

1. aminoglycoside-modifying enzymes and inactivation of the aminoglycosides, which is frequently seen in both gram-positive and gram-negative bacteria and is induced by nucleotidyltransferases, phosphotransferases, or aminoglycoside acetyltransferases.
2. reduced permeability.
3. enhanced efflux.
4. variations to the 30S ribosomal subunit that prevent aminoglycosides from binding to it.

== small RNAs ==
Study investigating physiological effect of pHK01 plasmid in host E.coli J53 found that the plasmid reduced bacterial motility and conferred resistance to beta-lactams. The pHK01 produced plasmid-encoded small RNAs and mediated expression of host sRNAs. These sRNAs were antisense to genes involved in replication, conjugate transfer and plasmid stabilisation : AS-repA3 (CopA), AS-traI, AS-finO, AS-traG, AS-pc02 . The over-expression of one of the plasmid-encoded antisense sRNAs: AS-traI shortened t lalog phase of host growth.
