= R1 plasmid =

Bacterial plasmid

The R1 plasmid is a plasmid that was first isolated from Salmonella paratyphi bacteria in 1963. It is a short plasmid, composed of 97,566 nucleotides and 120 genes, that belongs to the IncFII plasmid group. There are about one to two copies of the R1 plasmid per chromosome. The R1 plasmid imparts multi-drug antibiotic resistance to its host bacteria. The "R" in "R1" stands for "resistance", and the R1 plasmid contains resistance factors, or R factors, giving it the power to resist certain antibiotics.

It's known as a "low copy" plasmid, meaning that it exists in relatively few copies in any given bacteria. This characteristic allows the R1 plasmid to have an efficient plasmid stabilization system, that aids in stabilizing medium copy number plasmids. R1 must rely on a "Type II" segregation system. This plasmid system ensures that at least one copy is contained in each daughter cell after cell division.

== Structure ==
The R1 plasmid belongs to the IncFII plasmid group. The Inc plasmid group stands for incompatibility, and plasmids are classified into this group when two plasmids can't steadily propagate in the same host. The major incompatibility group involved in resistance and virulence gene transfer is the IncF group. Since R1 is an IncFII plasmid, that means it carries the FII replicon. This plasmid subtype often carries blaCTX-M genes.

=== Key genes and operons ===
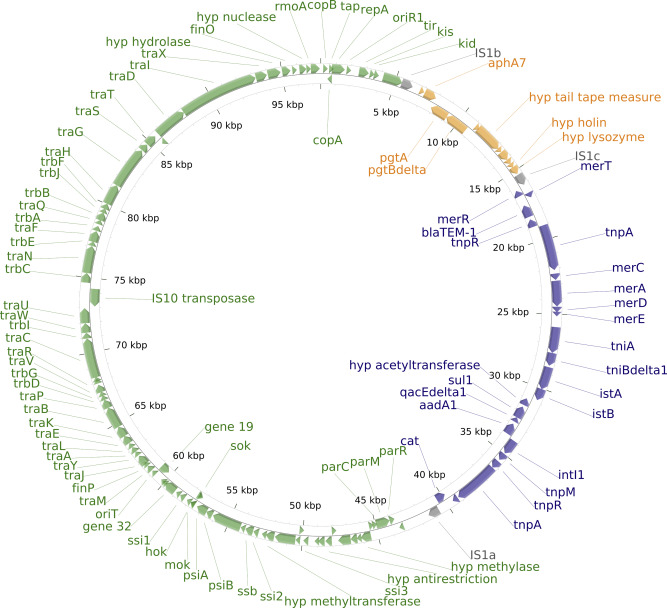
Figure 1. Map of the R1 Plasmid isolated by Katherine E. L. Cox and Joel F. Schildbach.

There are 120 genes on the R1 plasmid, and these genes can be sorted into three different groups. The largest group, as seen in green in Figure 1, is the conjugative plasmid backbone. The region pictured in purple is primarily a Tn21-like transposon, and the smallest region pictured in yellow contains sequences resembling those of Klebsiella oxytoca.

==== Replication ====
- repA: Initiates replication at the origin of replication (oriV), which helps it control plasmid copy number.
- copA: regulates repA mRNA translation by using an antisense RNA, controlling the frequency of replication.
- copB: contributes to the control of copy numbers by acting as a repressor protein that inhibits RepA transcription.
- oriV: origin of replication. RepA is needed in order to initiate replication.

==== Partitioning ====
- ParM: this protein forms dynamic filaments that push plasmid copies to opposite poles of the cell
- ParR: recruits ParM to the plasmid by acting as a DNA-binding protein that recognizes the ParC centromere-like site.
- ParC: the centromere-like site where ParR binds.

==== Conjugation ====
These genes enable horizontal gene transfer via conjugation, spreading the plasmid between bacteria.

- TraI: relaxase that initiates transfer by nicking the plasmid at the origin of transfer (oriT)
- TraM, traJ, traY: regulatory proteins that control expression of the tra operon and assembly of the conjugative pilus.
- trb genes: encode structural proteins of the mating pair formation system, including pilus components.
- oriT: origin of transfer. This is where DNA processing begins for conjugation.

==== Antibiotic resistance genes ====
The products of these genes provide multidrug resistance to commonly used antibiotics:

- blaTEM-1: provides resistance to ampicillin by encoding β-lactamase.
- cat: chloramphenicol acetyltransferase gene, provides resistance to chloramphenicol.
- aadA: aminoglycoside adenyltransferase, provides resistance to streptomycin and spectinomycin.
- sul1: sulfonamide resistance.

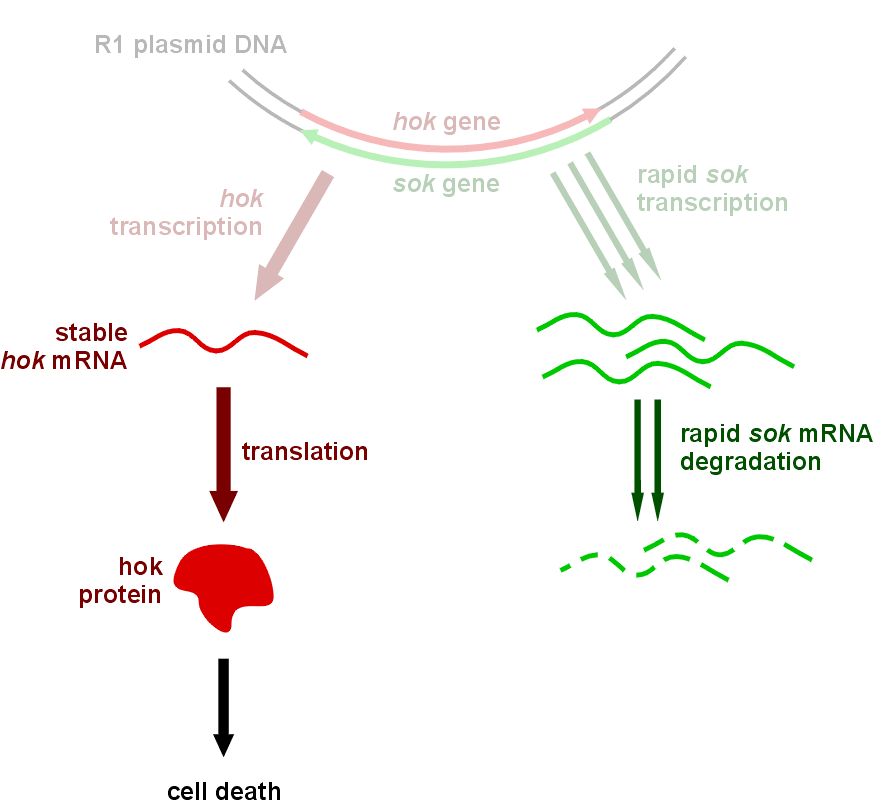
Figure 2: Hok sok system R1 plasmid absent

==== Addiction system ====
This genetic system stabilizes plasmid inheritance by killing plasmid-free segregants.

- The Hok/sok system a post-segregational killing system of the plasmid, toxin-antitoxin system
  - hok: encodes a toxin that kills cells without the plasmid.
  - sok: short anti-sense RNA that inhibits hok mRNA translation in plasmid carrying cells.

==== Maintenance and stability ====
These genes ensure plasmid molecules remain monomeric, aiding stable inheritance.

- resD: plays a role in site-specific recombination, resolving plasmid multimers back to monomers at the cer site.

ParM is a prokaryotic actin homologue which provides the force to drive copies of the R1 plasmid to opposite ends of rod shaped bacteria before division.

CopA-like RNA, an antisense RNA involved in replication control of the plasmid.

== Replication ==
Replication of the R1 plasmid begins at the oriRI site on the plasmid. RepA is the plasma-encoded initiator protein that binds to oriRI in order to initiate replication. RepA needs a 188-bp region of DNA at minimum in order to bind. Initiation of the leading strand, primed by DnaG, occurs at a G-type priming signal. This signal is located 400 bp downstream of the RepA-binding sequences.

A newly synthesized RepA protein is used by an oriR on the same template that it was synthesized on, a cis-specific action.

== Partitioning system ==
Ensures active segregation of plasmids during cell division, preventing plasmid loss.

The R1 plasmid partitioning is a mechanism needed for the inheritance of the R1 plasmid. The par system is composed of the ParR and the ParC regions, that interact together. The par system determines the position of the replicon, ensuring that at the end of DNA Replication, the plasmid copies are well-positioned to start cell division. The par system also allows for the initiation of ParM formation. ParM produces two important cytoskeletal proteins, MreB, and actin. ParM is directed to move the plasmid copies to opposite cell poles. Cell division takes place, resulting in the partitioned plasmids in two daughter cells.
