= Min System =

Mechanism used by E. coli in cell division

Displacement of the Z-ring and the Ter macrodomain in a long ΔslmA Δmin double mutant E. coli cell. Z-ring fluorescence is followed using a ZipA-GFP construct (green), while the chromosomal terminus is labeled with MatP-mCherry (red). A phase contrast image (gray) is overlaid to visualize the cell contour. The scale bar is 2 μm.

The Min System is a mechanism composed of three proteins MinC, MinD, and MinE used by E. coli as a means of properly localizing the septum prior to cell division. Each component participates in generating a dynamic oscillation of FtsZ protein inhibition between the two bacterial poles to precisely specify the mid-zone of the cell, allowing the cell to accurately divide in two. This system is known to function in conjunction with a second negative regulatory system, the nucleoid occlusion system (NO), to ensure proper spatial and temporal regulation of chromosomal segregation and division.

== History ==
The initial discovery of this family of proteins is attributed to Adler et al. (1967). First identified as E. coli mutants that could not produce a properly localized septum, resulting in the generation of minicells due to mislocalized cell division occurring near the bacterial poles. This caused miniature vesicles to pinch off, void of essential molecular constituents permitting it to exist as a viable bacterial cell. Minicells are achromosomal cells that are products of aberrant cell division, and contain RNA and protein, but little or no chromosomal DNA. This finding led to the identification of three interacting proteins involved in a dynamic system of localizing the mid-zone of the cell for properly controlled cell division.

== Function ==
The Min proteins prevent the FtsZ ring from being placed anywhere but near the mid cell and are hypothesized to be involved in a spatial regulatory mechanism that links size increases prior to cell division to FtsZ polymerization in the middle of the cell.

The MinCDE system. MinD-ATP binds to a cell pole, also binds MinC, which prevents the formation of FtsZ polymers. The MinE ring causes hydrolysis of MinD's bound ATP, turning it into ADP and releasing the complex from the membrane. The system oscillates as each pole builds up a concentration of inhibitor that is periodically dismantled.

=== Centering the Z-Ring ===
One model of Z-ring formation permits its formation only after a certain spatial signal that tells the cell that it is big enough to divide. The MinCDE system prevents FtsZ polymerization near certain parts of the plasma membrane. MinD localizes to the membrane only at cell poles and contains an ATPase and an ATP-binding domain. MinD is only able to bind to the membrane when in its ATP-bound conformation. Once anchored, the protein polymerizes, resulting in clusters of MinD. These clusters bind and then activate another protein called MinC, which has activity only when bound by MinD. MinC serves as a FtsZ inhibitor that prevents FtsZ polymerization. The high concentration of a FtsZ polymerization inhibitor at the poles prevents FtsZ from initiating division at anywhere but the mid-cell.

MinE is involved in preventing the formation of MinCD complexes in the middle of the cell. MinE forms a ring near each cell pole. This ring is not like the Z-ring. Instead, it catalyzes the release of MinD from the membrane by activating MinD's ATPase. This hydrolyzes the MinD's bound ATP, preventing it from anchoring itself to the membrane.

MinE prevents the MinD/C complex from forming in the center but allows it to stay at the poles. Once the MinD/C complex is released, MinC becomes inactivated. This prevents MinC from deactivating FtsZ. As a consequence, this activity imparts regional specificity to Min localization. Thus, FtsZ can form only in the center, where the concentration of the inhibitor MinC is minimal. Mutations that prevent the formation of MinE rings result in the MinCD zone extending well beyond the polar zones, preventing FtsZ to polymerize and to perform cell division. MinD requires a nucleotide exchange step to re-bind to ATP so that it can re-associate with the membrane after MinE release. The time lapse results in a periodicity of Min association that may yield clues to a temporal signal linked to a spatial signal. In vivo observations show that the oscillation of Min proteins between cell poles occurs approximately every 50 seconds. Oscillation of Min proteins, however, is not necessary for all bacterial cell division systems. Bacillus subtilis has been shown to have static concentrations of MinC and MinD at the cell poles. This system still links cell size to the ability to form a septum via FtsZ and divide.

=== in vitro Reconstitution ===
MinD (cyan) chased by MinE (magenta) to form spiraling waves on an artificial membrane

The dynamic behavior of Min proteins has been reconstituted in vitro using artificial lipid bilayers, with varying lipid composition and different confinement geometry as mimics for the cell membrane. The first pattern to be reconstituted were spiraling waves of MinD chased by MinE, followed by the reconstitution of waves of all three proteins, MinD, MinE and MinC. Importantly, MinD and MinE can self-organize into a wide variety of patterns depending on the reaction conditions.

Additional study is required to elucidate the extent of temporal and spatial signaling permissible by this biological function. These in vitro systems offered unprecedented access to features such as residence times and molecular motility.
