= FtsA =

Bacterial protein that is related to actin

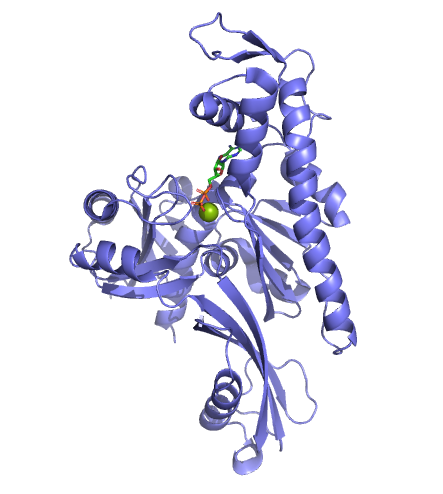
- Ribbon diagram of FtsA, with ADP bound to active site (multi-color sticks) and divalent magnesium cation (green sphere) highlighted.

Identifiers
- Organism: Xenorhabdus poinarii
- Symbol: FtsA
- Alt. symbols: Cell division protein FtsA
- Orthologs: OMA: entry
- PDB: 7Q6G
- UniProt: A0A068QZX9
Search for
- Structures: Swiss-model
- Domains: InterPro

FtsA

Identifiers
- Symbol: FtsA
- InterPro: IPR020823
Available protein structures:
- PDB: IPR020823
- AlphaFold: IPR020823

SHS2 "1C" domain inserted in FtsA

Identifiers
- Symbol: SHS2_FtsA
- Pfam: PF02491
- InterPro: IPR003494
- SMART: SM00842
Available protein structures:
- PDB: IPR003494 PF02491 (ECOD; PDBsum)
- AlphaFold: IPR003494; PF02491

FtsA is a bacterial protein that is related to actin by overall structural similarity and in its ATP binding pocket. It is involved in bacterial cell division, where it serves to tether the cytokinetic ring formed by FtsZ to the cytoplasmic membrane prior to division.

Along with other bacterial actin homologs such as MreB, ParM, and MamK, these proteins suggest that eukaryotic actin has a common ancestry. Like the other bacterial actins, FtsA binds ATP and can form actin-like filaments. The FtsA-FtsA interface has been defined by structural as well as genetic analysis. Although present in many diverse Gram-positive and Gram-negative species, FtsA is absent in actinobacteria and cyanobacteria. FtsA also is structurally similar to PilM, a type IV pilus ATPase.

== Function ==
FtsA is required for proper cytokinesis in bacteria such as Escherichia coli, Caulobacter crescentus, and Bacillus subtilis. Originally isolated in a screen for E. coli cells that could divide at 30˚C but not at 40˚C, FtsA stands for "filamentous temperature sensitive A". Many thermosensitive alleles of E. coli ftsA exist, and all map in or near the ATP binding pocket. Suppressors that restore normal function map either to the binding pocket or to the FtsA-FtsA interface.

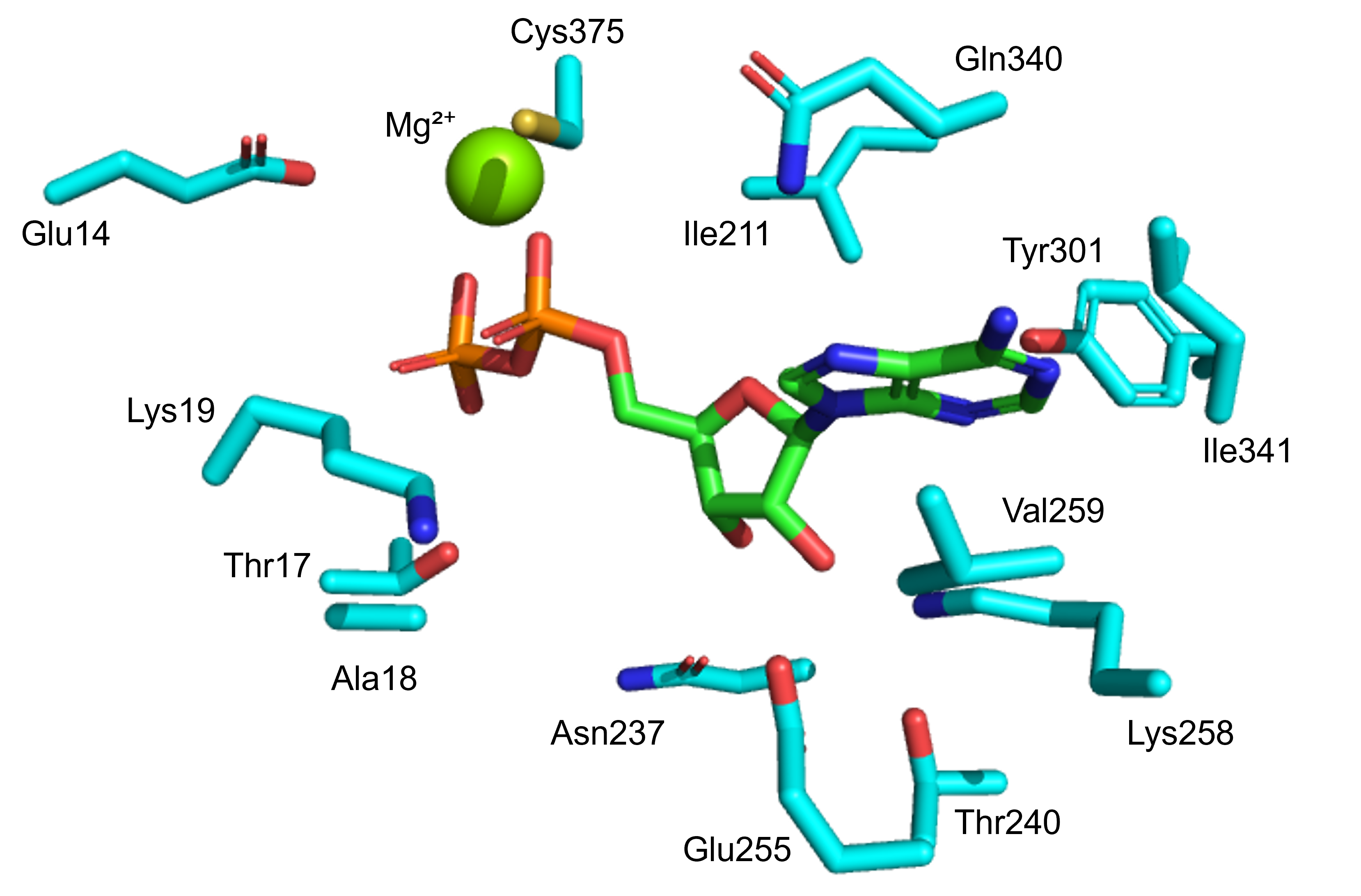
FtsA active site with ADP bound (PDB 7Q6G).

FtsA, like actin and its homologs, is an ATPase. While the exact catalytic mechanism of FtsA is not fully understood, glutamic acid Glu14 in the FtsA of Escherichia coli is indicated as a key residue involved in catalysis, as mutation of this residue impairs the enzyme's ability to hydrolyze ATP, in addition to halting phospholipid vesicle remodeling and Z-ring assembly in vivo. During cell division, FtsA self-polymerizes to form long, antiparallel double filaments that then localize to the cytokinetic ring formed by FtsZ (Z ring). This occurs via a conserved C-terminal amphipathic helix, forming an "A ring" in the process. Removal of this helix results in the formation of very long and stable polymer bundles of FtsA in the cell that do not function in cytokinesis. Another essential division protein, ZipA, also tethers the Z ring to the membrane and exhibits overlapping function with FtsA. FtsZ, FtsA and ZipA together are called the proto-ring because they are involved in a specific initial phase of cytokinesis. Another subdomain of FtsA (2B) is required for interactions with FtsZ, via the conserved C-terminus of FtsZ. Other FtsZ regulators including MinC and ZipA bind to the same C terminus of FtsZ. Finally, subdomain 1C, which is in a unique position relative to MreB and actin, is required for FtsA to recruit downstream cell division proteins such as FtsN.

Although FtsA is essential for viability in E. coli, it can be deleted in B. subtilis. B. subtilis cells lacking FtsA divide poorly but still survive. Another FtsZ-interacting protein, SepF (originally named YlmF; O31728), is able to replace FtsA in B. subtilis, suggesting that SepF and FtsA have overlapping functions. Unlike E. coli FtsA (see below), B. subtilis FtsA oligomers seem to be capable of treadmilling, suggesting that they may form parallel filaments.

An allele of FtsA called FtsA* (R286W) is able to bypass the normal requirement for the ZipA in E. coli cytokinesis. FtsA* also causes cells to divide at a shorter cell length than normal, suggesting that FtsA may normally receive signals from the septum synthesis machinery to regulate when cytokinesis can proceed. Other FtsA*-like alleles have been found, and they mostly decrease FtsA-FtsA interactions. Oligomeric state of FtsA is likely important for regulating its activity, its ability to recruit the later cell division proteins and its ability to bind ATP. Other cell division proteins of E. coli, including FtsN and the ABC transporter homologs FtsEX, seem to regulate septum constriction in part by signaling through FtsA in the cytoplasm, and the FtsQLB subcomplex is also involved in promoting FtsN-mediated septal constriction.

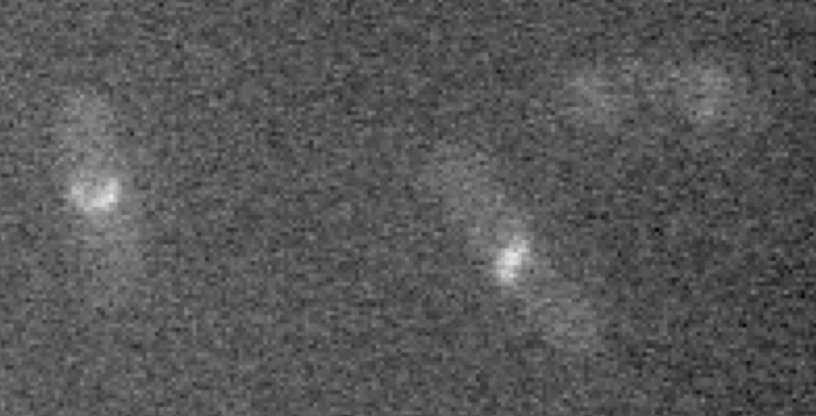
E. coli cells producing FtsA-GFP, which localizes to the cell division site.

FtsA binds directly to the conserved C-terminal domain of FtsZ. This FtsA-FtsZ interaction is likely involved in regulating FtsZ polymer dynamics. In vitro, E. coli FtsA disassembles FtsZ polymers in the presence of ATP, both in solution, as FtsA* and on supported lipid bilayers. E. coli FtsA itself does not assemble into detectable structures except when on membranes, where it forms dodecameric minirings that often pack in clusters and bind to single FtsZ protofilaments. In contrast, FtsA* forms arcs on lipid membranes but rarely closed minirings, supporting genetic evidence that this mutant has a weaker FtsA-FtsA interface. When bound to the membrane, FtsA*-like mutants, which also can form double-stranded filaments, enhance close lateral interactions between FtsZ protofilaments, in contrast to FtsA, which keeps FtsZ protofilaments apart. As FtsZ protofilament bundling may be important for promoting septum formation, a switch from an FtsA-like to an FtsA*-like conformation during cell cycle progression may serve to turn on septum synthesis enzymes (FtsWI) as well as condense FtsZ polymers, setting up a positive feedback loop. In support of this model, the cytoplasmic domain of FtsN, which activates FtsWI in E. coli and interacts directly with the 1C subdomain of FtsA, switches FtsA from the miniring form to the double stranded filament form on lipid surfaces in vitro. These double filaments of E. coli FtsA are antiparallel, indicating that they themselves do not treadmill like FtsZ filaments. Blocking formation of double FtsA filaments strongly inhibits septum formation, yet self-activated superfission variants of FtsW bypass this block, indicating that double FtsA filaments are normally required to activate FtsWI-mediated septum synthesis, probably by directly interacting with FtsW.

Although E. coli FtsA has been the most extensively studied, more is becoming understood about FtsA proteins from other species. FtsA from Streptococcus pneumoniae forms helical filaments in the presence of ATP, but no interactions with FtsZ in vitro have been reported yet. FtsA colocalizes with FtsZ in S. pneumoniae, but also is required for FtsZ ring localization, in contrast to E. coli where FtsZ rings remain localized upon inactivation of FtsA. FtsA from Staphylococcus aureus forms actin-like filaments similar to those of FtsA from Thermotoga maritima. In addition, S. aureus FtsA enhances the GTPase activity of FtsZ. In a liposome system, FtsA* stimulates FtsZ to form rings that can divide liposomes, mimicking cytokinesis in vitro.

== Structure ==
Several crystal structures for FtsA are known, including a structure for E. coli FtsA. Compared to MreB and eukaryotic actin, the subdomains are rearranged, and the 1B domain is swapped out for the SHS2 "1C" insert.
