= Minicell =

Abnormally small bacterial cells

In bacteriology, minicells are bacterial cells that are smaller than usual. The first minicells reported were from a strain of Escherichia coli that had a mutation in the Min System that lead to mis-localization of the septum during cell division and the production of cells of random sizes.

== Generation of minicells ==
The first report of minicells in scientific literature dates to 1930, but the first use of the term "minicell" dates to 1967.

Minicells of a variety of gram negative and gram positive bacteria, including Escherichia coli and Salmonella enterica, have been reported, but in principle, minicells could be generated for any bacterial species that can be genetically edited. Minicells cannot reproduce because they do not contain a full copy of the genome.

== Normal role of minicells in bacteriology ==
Scientists hypothesize that minicells are produced by normal bacteria in times of stress so that damaged areas of the cell can be expelled.

== Applications of minicells ==
Minicells have been extensively used to study ultrastructure of bacteria using electron cryotomography (cryoET). Minicells are ideal for cryoET because they are small enough for the electron beam to penetrate in transmission electron microscopy.

Bacterial minicells are being developed as a drug delivery system. Minicells could be used to deliver genetic material to eukaryotic cells for gene editing. They are also being investigated for vaccine development.
