= Cytoskeleton =

Network of filamentous proteins that forms the internal framework of cells

Cell biology
- Animal cell diagram
- Components of a typical animal cell: 1. Nucleolus; 2. Nucleus; 3. Ribosome (dots as part of 5); 4. Vesicle; 5. Rough endoplasmic reticulum 6. Golgi apparatus (or, Golgi body); 7. Cytoskeleton; 8. Smooth endoplasmic reticulum 9. Mitochondrion; 10. Vacuole; 11. Cytosol (fluid that contains organelles; with which, comprises cytoplasm); 12. Lysosome; 13. Centrosome; 14. Cell membrane

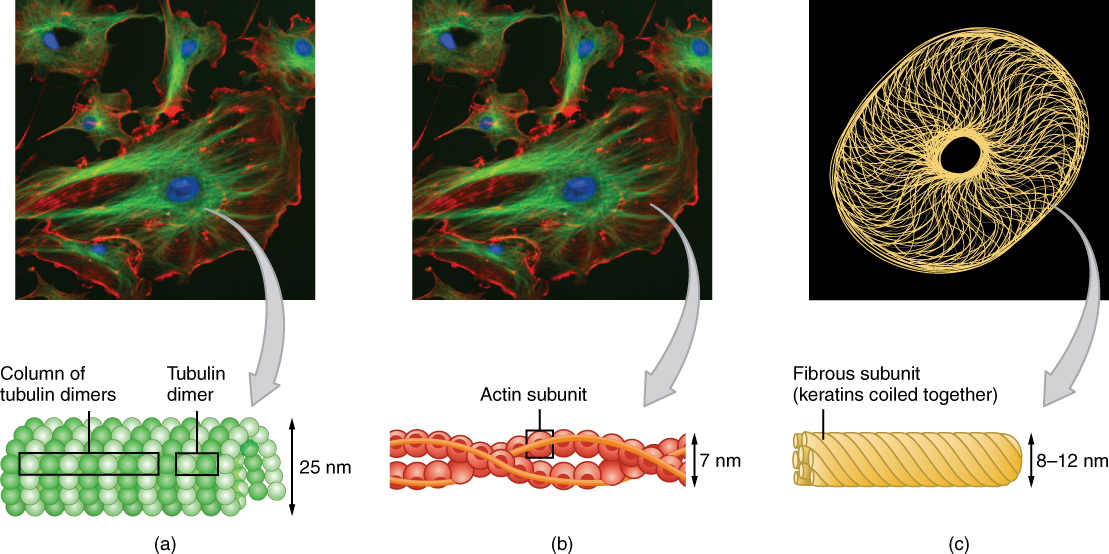
The cytoskeleton consists of (a) microtubules, (b) microfilaments, and (c) intermediate filaments.

The cytoskeleton is a complex, dynamic network of interlinking protein filaments present in the cytoplasm of all cells, including those of bacteria and archaea. In eukaryotes, it extends from the cell nucleus to the cell membrane and is composed of similar proteins in the various organisms. It is composed of three main components: microfilaments, intermediate filaments, and microtubules, and these are all capable of rapid growth and/or disassembly depending on the cell's requirements.

The cytoskeleton can perform many functions. Its primary function is to give the cell its shape and mechanical resistance to deformation, and through association with extracellular connective tissue and other cells it stabilizes entire tissues. The cytoskeleton can also contract, thereby deforming the cell and the cell's environment and allowing cells to migrate. Moreover, it is involved in many cell signaling pathways and in the uptake of extracellular material (endocytosis), the segregation of chromosomes during cellular division, the cytokinesis stage of cell division, as scaffolding to organize the contents of the cell in space and in intracellular transport (for example, the movement of vesicles and organelles within the cell) and can be a template for the construction of a cell wall. Furthermore, it can form specialized structures, such as flagella, cilia, lamellipodia and podosomes. The structure, function and dynamic behavior of the cytoskeleton can be very different, depending on organism and cell type. Even within one cell, the cytoskeleton can change through association with other proteins and the previous history of the network.

A large-scale example of an action performed by the cytoskeleton is muscle contraction. This is carried out by groups of highly specialized cells working together. A main component in the cytoskeleton that helps show the true function of this muscle contraction is the microfilament. Microfilaments are composed of the most abundant cellular protein known as actin. During contraction of a muscle, within each muscle cell, myosin molecular motors collectively exert forces on parallel actin filaments. Muscle contraction starts from nerve impulses which then causes increased amounts of calcium to be released from the sarcoplasmic reticulum. Increases in calcium in the cytosol allows muscle contraction to begin with the help of two proteins, tropomyosin and troponin. Tropomyosin inhibits the interaction between actin and myosin, while troponin senses the increase in calcium and releases the inhibition. This action contracts the muscle cell, and through the synchronous process in many muscle cells, the entire muscle.

== History ==
In 1903, Nikolai K. Koltsov proposed that the shape of cells was determined by a network of tubules that he termed the cytoskeleton. The concept of a protein mosaic that dynamically coordinated cytoplasmic biochemistry was proposed by Rudolph Peters in 1929 while the term (cytosquelette, in French) was first introduced by French embryologist Paul Wintrebert in 1931.

When the cytoskeleton was first introduced, it was thought to be an uninteresting gel-like substance that helped organelles stay in place. Much research took place to try to understand the purpose of the cytoskeleton and its components.

Initially, it was thought that the cytoskeleton was exclusive to eukaryotes but in 1992 it was discovered to be present in prokaryotes as well. This discovery came after the realization that bacteria possess proteins that are homologous to tubulin and actin; the main components of the eukaryotic cytoskeleton.

== Eukaryotic cytoskeleton ==
Eukaryotic cells contain three main kinds of cytoskeletal filaments: microfilaments, microtubules, and intermediate filaments. In neurons the intermediate filaments are known as neurofilaments. Each type is formed by the polymerization of a distinct type of protein subunit and has its own characteristic shape and intracellular distribution. Microfilaments are polymers of the protein actin and are 7 nm in diameter. Microtubules are composed of tubulin and are 25 nm in diameter. Intermediate filaments are composed of various proteins, depending on the type of cell in which they are found; they are normally 8-12 nm in diameter. The cytoskeleton provides the cell with structure and shape, and by excluding macromolecules from some of the cytosol, it adds to the level of macromolecular crowding in this compartment. Cytoskeletal elements interact extensively and intimately with cellular membranes.

Research into neurodegenerative disorders such as Parkinson's disease, Alzheimer's disease, Huntington's disease, and amyotrophic lateral sclerosis (ALS) indicate that the cytoskeleton is affected in these diseases. Parkinson's disease is marked by the degradation of neurons, resulting in tremors, rigidity, and other non-motor symptoms. Research has shown that microtubule assembly and stability in the cytoskeleton is compromised causing the neurons to degrade over time. In Alzheimer's disease, tau proteins which stabilize microtubules malfunction in the progression of the illness causing pathology of the cytoskeleton. Excess glutamine in the Huntington protein (huntingtin) involved with linking vesicles onto the cytoskeleton is also proposed to be a factor in the development of Huntington's Disease. Amyotrophic lateral sclerosis results in a loss of movement caused by the degradation of motor neurons, and also involves defects of the cytoskeleton.

Stuart Hameroff and Roger Penrose suggest a role of microtubule vibrations in neurons in the origin of consciousness.

Accessory proteins including motor proteins regulate and link the filaments to other cell compounds and each other and are essential for controlled assembly of cytoskeletal filaments in particular locations.

A number of small-molecule cytoskeletal drugs have been discovered that interact with actin and microtubules. These compounds have proven useful in studying the cytoskeleton, and several have clinical applications.

=== Microfilaments ===
Structure of a microfilament

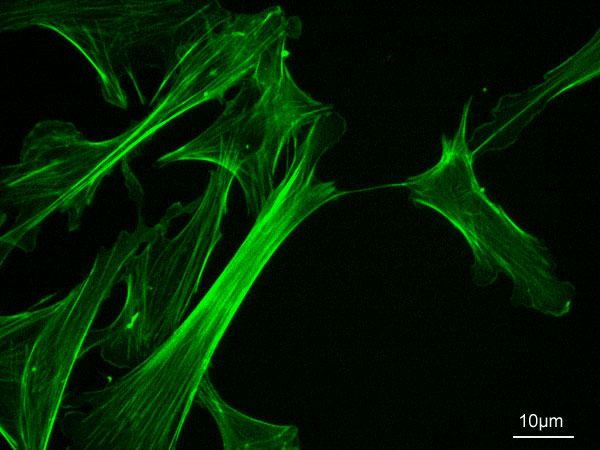
Actin cytoskeleton of mouse embryo fibroblasts, stained with phalloidin

Microfilaments, also known as actin filaments, are composed of linear polymers of G-actin proteins, and generate force when the growing (plus) end of the filament pushes against a barrier, such as the cell membrane. They also act as tracks for the movement of myosin molecules that affix to the microfilament and "walk" along them. In general, the major component or protein of microfilaments are actin. The G-actin monomer combines to form a polymer which continues to form the microfilament (actin filament). These subunits then assemble into two chains that intertwine into what are called F-actin chains. Myosin motoring along F-actin filaments generates contractile forces in so-called actomyosin fibers, both in muscle as well as most non-muscle cell types. Actin structures are controlled by the Rho family of small GTP-binding proteins such as Rho itself for contractile acto-myosin filaments ("stress fibers"), Rac for lamellipodia and Cdc42 for filopodia.

Functions include:

- Muscle contraction
- Cell movement
- Intracellular transport/trafficking
- Maintenance of eukaryotic cell shape
- Cytokinesis
- Cytoplasmic streaming

=== Intermediate filaments ===
Structure of an intermediate filament

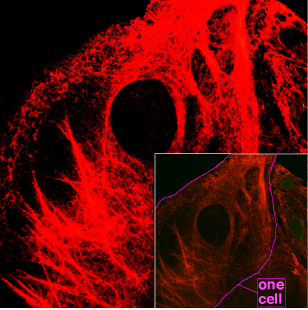
Microscopy of keratin filaments inside cells

Intermediate filaments are a part of the cytoskeleton of many eukaryotic cells. These filaments, averaging 10 nanometers in diameter, are more stable (strongly bound) than microfilaments, and heterogeneous constituents of the cytoskeleton. Like actin filaments, they function in the maintenance of cell-shape by bearing tension (microtubules, by contrast, resist compression but can also bear tension during mitosis and during the positioning of the centrosome). Intermediate filaments organize the internal tridimensional structure of the cell, anchoring organelles and serving as structural components of the nuclear lamina. They also participate in some cell-cell and cell-matrix junctions. Nuclear lamina exist in all animals and all tissues. Some animals like the fruit fly do not have any cytoplasmic intermediate filaments. In those animals that express cytoplasmic intermediate filaments, these are tissue specific. Keratin intermediate filaments in epithelial cells provide protection for different mechanical stresses the skin may endure. They also provide protection for organs against metabolic, oxidative, and chemical stresses. Strengthening of epithelial cells with these intermediate filaments may prevent onset of apoptosis, or cell death, by reducing the probability of stress.

Intermediate filaments are most commonly known as the support system or "scaffolding" for the cell and nucleus while also playing a role in some cell functions. In combination with proteins and desmosomes, the intermediate filaments form cell-cell connections and anchor the cell-matrix junctions that are used in messaging between cells as well as vital functions of the cell. These connections allow the cell to communicate through the desmosome of multiple cells to adjust structures of the tissue based on signals from the cells environment. Mutations in the IF proteins have been shown to cause serious medical issues such as premature aging, desmin mutations compromising organs, Alexander disease, and muscular dystrophy.

Different intermediate filaments are:

- made of vimentins. Vimentin intermediate filaments are in general present in mesenchymal cells.
- made of keratin. Keratin is present in general in epithelial cells.
- neurofilaments of neural cells.
- made of lamin, giving structural support to the nuclear envelope.
- made of desmin, play an important role in structural and mechanical support of muscle cells.

=== Microtubules ===
Structure of a microtubule

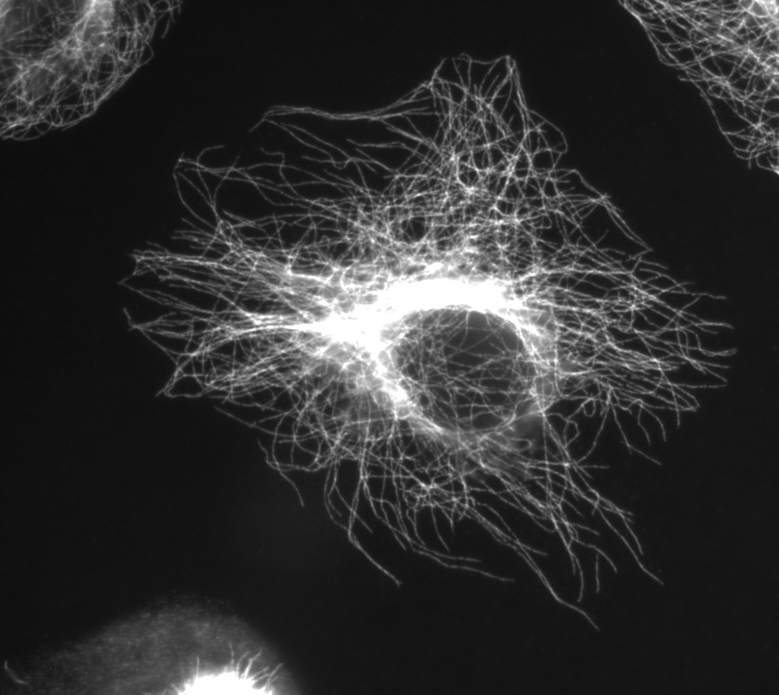
Microtubules in a gel-fixated cell

Microtubules are hollow cylinders about 23 nm in diameter (lumen diameter of approximately 15 nm), most commonly comprising 13 protofilaments that, in turn, are polymers of alpha and beta tubulin. They have a very dynamic behavior, binding GTP for polymerization. They are commonly organized by the centrosome.

In nine triplet sets (star-shaped), they form the centrioles, and in nine doublets oriented about two additional microtubules (wheel-shaped), they form cilia and flagella. The latter formation is commonly referred to as a "9+2" arrangement, wherein each doublet is connected to another by the protein dynein. As both flagella and cilia are structural components of the cell, and are maintained by microtubules, they can be considered part of the cytoskeleton. There are two types of cilia: motile and non-motile cilia. Cilia are short and more numerous than flagella. The motile cilia have a rhythmic waving or beating motion compared to the non-motile cilia which receive sensory information for the cell; processing signals from the other cells or the fluids surrounding it. Additionally, the microtubules control the beating (movement) of the cilia and flagella. Also, the dynein arms attached to the microtubules function as the molecular motors. The motion of the cilia and flagella is created by the microtubules sliding past one another, which requires ATP. They play key roles in:

- intracellular transport (associated with dyneins and kinesins, they transport organelles like mitochondria or vesicles).
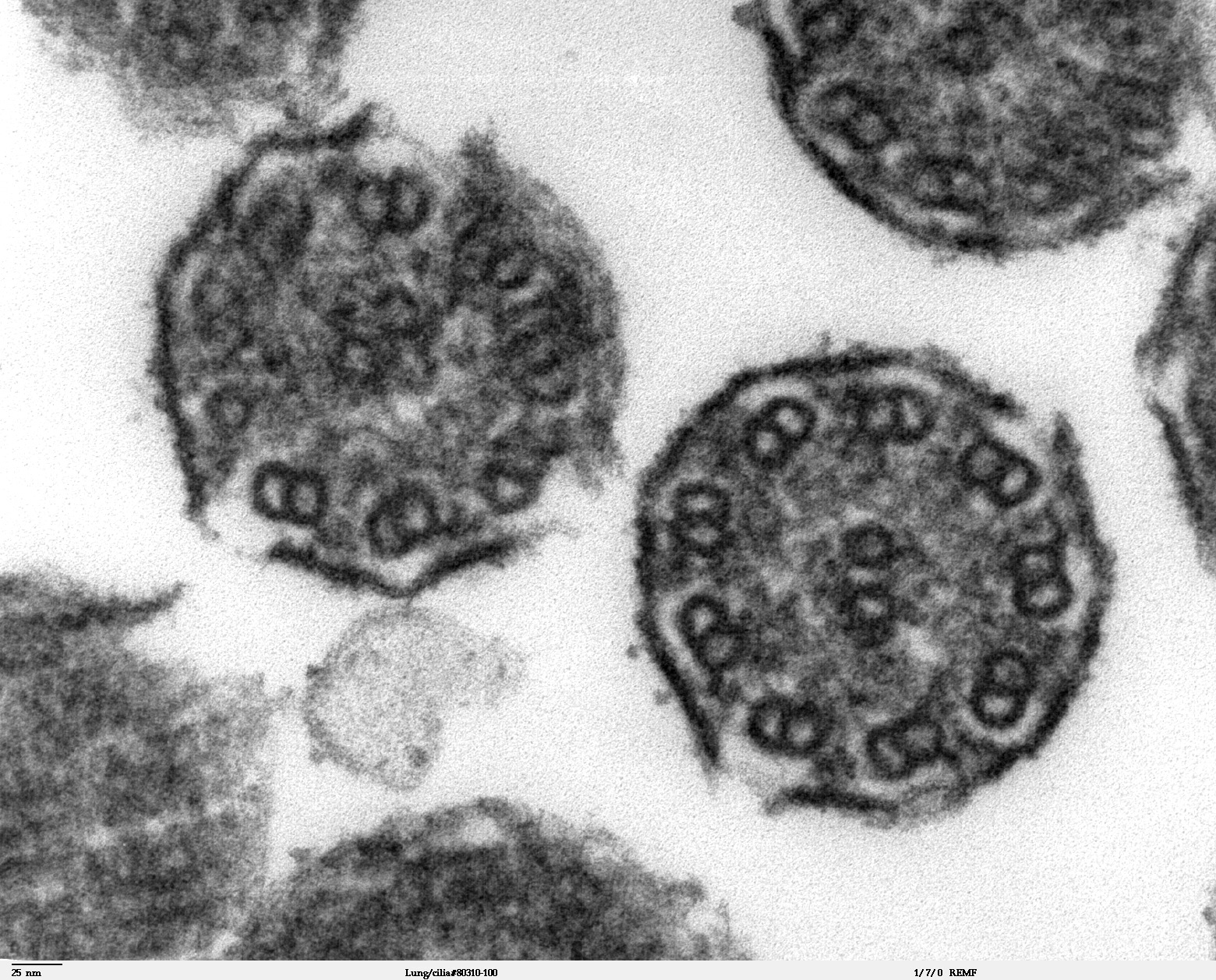
- Cross section diagram through the cilium, showing the "9 + 2" arrangement of microtubules
  the axoneme of cilia and flagella.
- the mitotic spindle.
- synthesis of the cell wall in plants.

In addition to the roles described above, Stuart Hameroff and Roger Penrose have proposed that microtubules function in consciousness.

=== Comparison ===
Cytoskeleton type	Diameter (nm)	Structure	Subunit examples
Microfilaments	6	Double helix	Actin
Intermediate filaments	10	Two anti-parallel helices/dimers, forming tetramers	Vimentin (mesenchyme); Glial fibrillary acidic protein (glial cells); Neurofilament proteins (neuronal processes); Keratins (epithelial cells); Nuclear lamins
Microtubules	23	Protofilaments, in turn consisting of tubulin subunits in complex with stathmin	α- and β-Tubulin

=== Septins ===
Septins are a group of the highly conserved GTP binding proteins found in eukaryotes. Different septins form protein complexes with each other. These can assemble to filaments and rings. Therefore, septins can be considered part of the cytoskeleton. The function of septins in cells include serving as a localized attachment site for other proteins, and preventing the diffusion of certain molecules from one cell compartment to another. In yeast cells, they build scaffolding to provide structural support during cell division and compartmentalize parts of the cell. Recent research in human cells suggests that septins build cages around bacterial pathogens, immobilizing the harmful microbes and preventing them from invading other cells.

=== Spectrin ===
Spectrin is a cytoskeletal protein that lines the intracellular side of the plasma membrane in many eukaryotic cells particularly animal cells, but is not present in plant cells, or yeast. Spectrin forms pentagonal or hexagonal arrangements, forming a scaffolding and playing an important role in maintenance of plasma membrane integrity and cytoskeletal structure.

=== Yeast cytoskeleton ===
In budding yeast (an important model organism), actin forms cortical patches, actin cables, and a cytokinetic ring and the cap. Cortical patches are discrete actin bodies on the membrane and are vital for endocytosis, especially the recycling of glucan synthase which is important for cell wall synthesis. Actin cables are bundles of actin filaments and are involved in the transport of vesicles towards the cap (which contains a number of different proteins to polarize cell growth) and in the positioning of mitochondria. The cytokinetic ring forms and constricts around the site of cell division.

== Prokaryotic cytoskeleton ==
Prior to the work of Jones et al., 2001, the cell wall was believed to be the deciding factor for many bacterial cell shapes, including rods and spirals. When studied, many misshapen bacteria were found to have mutations linked to development of a cell envelope. The cytoskeleton was once thought to be a feature only of eukaryotic cells, but homologues to all the major proteins of the eukaryotic cytoskeleton have been found in prokaryotes. Harold Erickson notes that before 1992, only eukaryotes were believed to have cytoskeleton components. However, research in the early '90s suggested that bacteria and archaea had homologues of actin and tubulin, and that these were the basis of eukaryotic microtubules and microfilaments. Although the evolutionary relationships are so distant that they are not obvious from protein sequence comparisons alone, the similarity of their three-dimensional structures and similar functions in maintaining cell shape and polarity provides strong evidence that the eukaryotic and prokaryotic cytoskeletons are truly homologous. Three laboratories independently discovered that FtsZ, a protein already known as a key player in bacterial cytokinesis, had the "tubulin signature sequence" present in all α-, β-, and γ-tubulins. However, some structures in the bacterial cytoskeleton may not have been identified as of yet.

=== FtsZ ===
FtsZ was the first protein of the prokaryotic cytoskeleton to be identified. Like tubulin, FtsZ forms filaments in the presence of guanosine triphosphate (GTP), but these filaments do not group into tubules. During cell division, FtsZ is the first protein to move to the division site, and is essential for recruiting other proteins that synthesize the new cell wall between the dividing cells.

=== MreB and ParM ===
Prokaryotic actin-like proteins, such as MreB, are involved in the maintenance of cell shape. All non-spherical bacteria have genes encoding actin-like proteins, and these proteins form a helical network beneath the cell membrane that guides the proteins involved in cell wall biosynthesis.

Some plasmids encode a separate system that involves an actin-like protein ParM. Filaments of ParM exhibit dynamic instability, and may partition plasmid DNA into the dividing daughter cells by a mechanism analogous to that used by microtubules during eukaryotic mitosis.

=== Crescentin ===
The bacterium Caulobacter crescentus contains a third protein, crescentin, that is related to the intermediate filaments of eukaryotic cells. Crescentin is also involved in maintaining cell shape, such as helical and vibrioid forms of bacteria, but the mechanism by which it does this is currently unclear. Additionally, curvature could be described by the displacement of crescentic filaments, after the disruption of peptidoglycan synthesis.

== The cytoskeleton and cell mechanics ==
The cytoskeleton is a highly anisotropic and dynamic network, constantly remodeling itself in response to the changing cellular microenvironment. The network influences cell mechanics and dynamics by differentially polymerizing and depolymerizing its constituent filaments (primarily actin and myosin, but microtubules and intermediate filaments also play a role). This generates forces, which play an important role in informing the cell of its microenvironment. Specifically, forces such as tension, stiffness, and shear forces have all been shown to influence cell fate, differentiation, migration, and motility. Through a process called "mechanotransduction," the cell remodels its cytoskeleton to sense and respond to these forces.

Mechanotransduction relies heavily on focal adhesions, which essentially connect the intracellular cytoskeleton with the extracellular matrix (ECM). Through focal adhesions, the cell is able to integrate extracellular forces into intracellular ones as the proteins present at focal adhesions undergo conformational changes to initiate signaling cascades. Proteins such as focal adhesion kinase (FAK) and Src have been shown to transduce force signals in response to cellular activities such as proliferation and differentiation, and are hypothesized to be key sensors in the mechanotransduction pathway. As a result of mechanotransduction, the cytoskeleton changes its composition and/or orientation to accommodate the force stimulus and ensure the cell responds accordingly.

The cytoskeleton changes the mechanics of the cell in response to detected forces. For example, increasing tension within the plasma membrane makes it more likely that ion channels will open, which increases ion conductance and makes cellular change ion influx or efflux much more likely. Moreover, the mechanical properties of cells determine how far and where, directionally, a force will propagate throughout the cell and how it will change cell dynamics. A membrane protein that is not closely coupled to the cytoskeleton, for instance, will not produce a significant effect on the cortical actin network if it is subjected to a specifically directed force. However, membrane proteins that are more closely associated with the cytoskeleton will induce a more significant response. In this way, the anisotropy of the cytoskeleton serves to more keenly direct cell responses to intra or extracellular signals.

== Long-range order ==
The specific pathways and mechanisms by which the cytoskeleton senses and responds to forces are still under investigation. However, the long-range order generated by the cytoskeleton is known to contribute to mechanotransduction. Cells, which are around 10–50 μm in diameter, are several thousand times larger than the molecules found within the cytoplasm that are essential to coordinate cellular activities. Because cells are so large in comparison to essential biomolecules, it is difficult, in the absence of an organizing network, for different parts of the cytoplasm to communicate. Moreover, biomolecules must polymerize to lengths comparable to the length of the cell, but resulting polymers can be highly disorganized and unable to effectively transmit signals from one part of the cytoplasm to another. Thus, it is necessary to have the cytoskeleton to organize the polymers and ensure that they can effectively communicate across the entirety of the cell.

== Common features and differences between prokaryotes and eukaryotes ==
By definition, the cytoskeleton is composed of proteins that can form longitudinal arrays (fibres) in all organisms. These filament forming proteins have been classified into 4 classes. Tubulin-like, actin-like, Walker A cytoskeletal ATPases (WACA-proteins), and intermediate filaments.

Tubulin-like proteins are tubulin in eukaryotes and FtsZ, TubZ, RepX in prokaryotes. Actin-like proteins are actin in eukaryotes and MreB, FtsA in prokaryotes. An example of a WACA-proteins, which are mostly found in prokaryotes, is MinD. Examples for intermediate filaments, which have almost exclusively been found in animals (i.e. eukaryotes) are the lamins, keratins, vimentin, neurofilaments, and desmin.

Although tubulin-like proteins share some amino acid sequence similarity, their equivalence in protein-fold and the similarity in the GTP binding site is more striking. The same holds true for the actin-like proteins and their structure and ATP binding domain.

Cytoskeletal proteins are usually correlated with cell shape, DNA segregation and cell division in prokaryotes and eukaryotes. Which proteins fulfill which task is very different. For example, DNA segregation in all eukaryotes happens through use of tubulin, but in prokaryotes either WACA proteins, actin-like or tubulin-like proteins can be used. Cell division is mediated in eukaryotes by actin, but in prokaryotes usually by tubulin-like (often FtsZ-ring) proteins and sometimes (Thermoproteota) ESCRT-III, which in eukaryotes still has a role in the last step of division.

== Cytoplasmic streaming ==
Movement of organelles in Tradescantia stamen hair cells

Cytoplasmic streaming, also known as cyclosis, is the active movement of a cell's contents along the components of the cytoskeleton. While mainly seen in plants, all cell types use this process for transportation of waste, nutrients, and organelles to other parts of the cell. Plant and algae cells are generally larger than many other cells; so cytoplasmic streaming is important in these types of cells. This is because the cell's extra volume requires cytoplasmic streaming in order to move organelles throughout the entire cell. Organelles move along microfilaments in the cytoskeleton driven by myosin motors binding and pushing along actin filament bundles.

== See also ==
- Nuclear matrix – Fibrillar network lying on nuclear membrane
- Cell cortex – Layer on the inner face of a cell membrane
