= ZapA family =

Family of proteins in molecular biology

ZapA
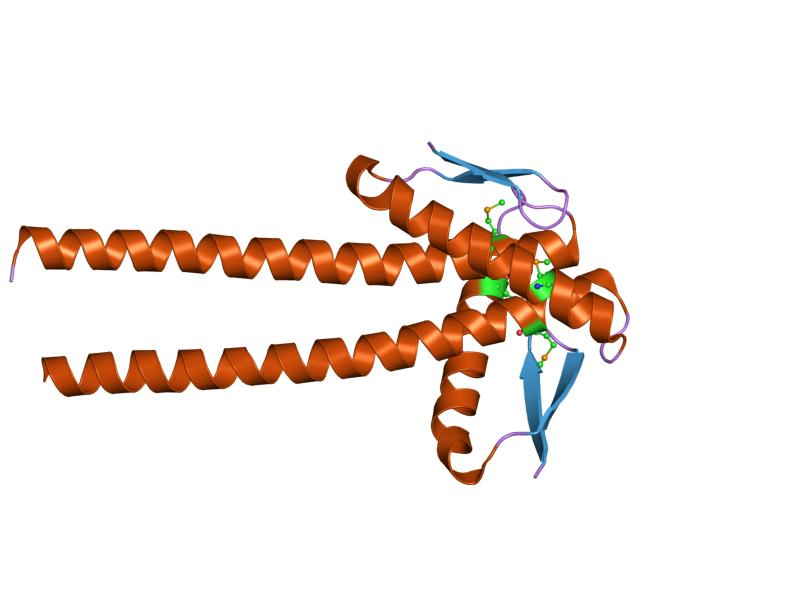
- The crystal structure of the bacterial cell division protein ZapA

Identifiers
- Symbol: ZapA
- Pfam: PF05164
- InterPro: IPR007838
- SCOP2: 1t3u / SCOPe / SUPFAM
Available protein structures:
- Pfam: structures / ECOD
- PDB: RCSB PDB; PDBe; PDBj
- PDBsum: structure summary

In molecular biology, the ZapA protein family is a group of related proteins that includes the cell division protein ZapA. The structure of ZapA has a core structure consisting of two layers alpha/beta, and has a long C-terminal helix that forms dimeric parallel and tetrameric antiparallel coiled coils. ZapA interacts with FtsZ, where FtsZ is part of a mid-cell cytokinetic structure termed the Z-ring that recruits a hierarchy of fission related proteins early in the bacterial cell cycle. ZapA drives the polymerisation and filament bundling of FtsZ, thereby contributing to the spatio-temporal tuning of the Z-ring.
