= MreB =

Bacterial cytoskeletal protein and actin homolog

Cell shape-determining protein MreB/Mbl
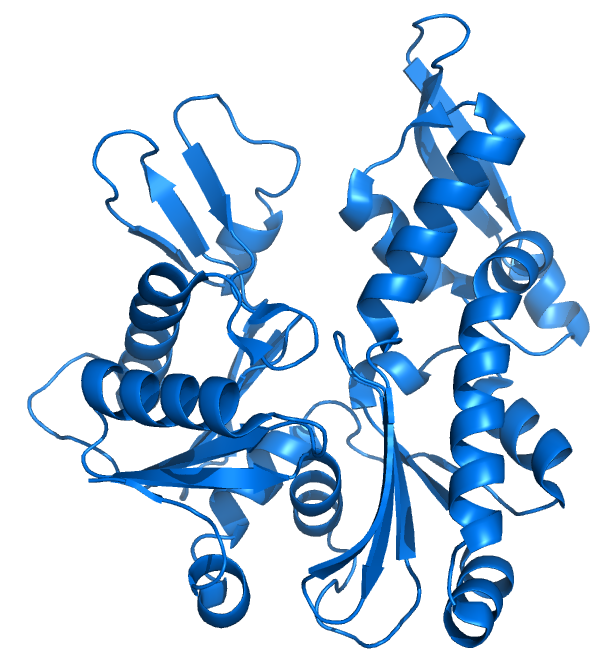
- MreB (PDB: 1JCE) shown in cartoon representation. Its fold is similar to that of eukaryotic actin.

Identifiers
- Symbol: MreB
- Pfam: PF06723
- InterPro: IPR004753
- CDD: cd10225
Available protein structures:
- PDB: 1jce IPR004753 PF06723 (ECOD; PDBsum)
- AlphaFold: IPR004753; PF06723

MreB is a protein found in bacteria that is a homolog of actin, a major component of the cytoskeleton in eukaryotes. MreB is one of the most widespread bacterial actin homologs, and together with the tubulin-like protein FtsZ and the intermediate-filament-like protein crescentin it is among the best-studied components of the prokaryotic cytoskeleton. The protein is best known for determining and maintaining the shape of non-spherical bacteria. It is a major determinant of rod shape and contributes to width control in many species, including Escherichia coli; in E. coli, defective MreB or treatment with the MreB inhibitor A22 causes cells to widen and can make them nearly spherical. In Bacillus subtilis, by contrast, cell diameter is set by the opposing actions of the Rod complex and class-A penicillin-binding proteins rather than by MreB alone.

Inside the cell, MreB binds to the inner face of the cell membrane and assembles into short filaments. These filaments are part of a cell-wall–building machine, the Rod complex (or elongasome), and they move around the circumference of the cell as new peptidoglycan is inserted into the lateral wall, supporting the cell's elongation along its long axis while contributing to width control.

== Discovery and nomenclature ==
The mreB gene was identified in E. coli in the 1980s during a search for mutants with altered shape and mecillinam sensitivity, and the gene was subsequently cloned and sequenced. MreB, along with MreC and MreD, is named after the mre operon ("murein region E"; murein is another name for peptidoglycan), the gene cluster to which the three genes belong.

== Structure and relationship to actin ==
Although MreB and actin share little sequence identity, their three-dimensional structures are strikingly similar: both adopt the same fold, bind and hydrolyze ATP in an equivalent nucleotide-binding cleft, and conserve the key active-site residues. This structural conservation is taken as evidence that MreB and actin belong to an evolutionarily related actin superfamily. MreB proteins bind nucleotides and polymerize into filaments; in vitro, MreB from Thermotoga maritima can form sheets of interwoven filaments in the presence of ATP or GTP. High-resolution structures of Caulobacter MreB show that its filaments are built from two protofilaments arranged in an antiparallel double filament that lies flat against, and binds directly to, the membrane—an architecture that differs from the helical, polar filaments of eukaryotic actin.

== Function in cell-wall synthesis and shape ==
MreB is central to rod-shape maintenance. An E. coli mutant that produces defective MreB grows as spherical cells instead of rods, and most bacteria that are naturally spherical lack the mreB gene altogether. Rather than building the wall itself, MreB filaments associate with and help organize the Rod complex (elongasome). In this machine, the SEDS protein RodA acts as the peptidoglycan glycosyltransferase (polymerase) together with the transpeptidase penicillin-binding protein 2 (PBP2); this Rod-complex synthesis operates semi-autonomously from the class-A penicillin-binding proteins that also build the wall. In E. coli, the membrane protein RodZ is required for proper assembly of the MreB cytoskeleton. RodZ also links MreB to cell-wall synthesis; circumferential MreB motion is dispensable for rod shape under standard laboratory conditions but contributes to robust morphogenesis under cell-wall stress. These complexes move mainly around the cell circumference as they insert peptidoglycan into the lateral wall, supporting elongation along the long axis while contributing to width control. How MreB, PBP2, and the other components select where new wall material is added remains an active area of study.

== Filament organization and dynamics ==
Early fluorescence microscopy of tagged protein described extended helical MreB structures winding beneath the cell membrane in B. subtilis. This "helical cytoskeleton" picture was revised around 2011. Electron cryotomography of several rod-shaped species failed to detect long filaments encircling the cell, and a commonly used N-terminal fluorescent-protein fusion in E. coli was shown to generate an artifactual helical pattern that the native, untagged protein does not form. Current imaging instead supports multiple short, discrete membrane-associated filaments that move circumferentially around the cell, although their length and organization vary among organisms and conditions. This motion is not generated by MreB polymerization itself: it stops when peptidoglycan synthesis is blocked, indicating that the filaments are driven by processive cell-wall synthesis carried out by the associated Rod complexes.

== Spatial regulation by cell geometry ==
The positions and orientations of MreB filaments respond to the cell's own shape, creating feedback that helps keep rods straight and uniform, although the relevant geometric feature differs among organisms. In shape-perturbed E. coli, MreB becomes enriched at regions of negative Gaussian curvature (saddle-shaped surface defects), directing new wall synthesis toward these regions to restore a uniform rod. In B. subtilis, MreB filaments preferentially align with the direction of greatest principal membrane curvature, orienting circumferential cell-wall synthesis. In E. coli, the pitch angle at which MreB filaments wrap around the cell correlates inversely with the cell's diameter, linking filament orientation to the width the cell adopts. This geometry-based control can restore rod-like growth in wall-deficient L-form bacteria in an MreB-dependent manner. MreB localization alone does not, however, account for the straightening of mechanically bent cells, which has instead been linked to mechanical strain–dependent patterns of cell-wall growth.

== Distribution across bacteria ==
Genes encoding MreB are widespread among rod-shaped, curved, and helical bacteria, whereas many naturally spherical (coccoid) species lack them, consistent with MreB's role in lateral-wall elongation. Some bacteria encode more than one MreB-family paralog: B. subtilis, for example, produces MreB, Mbl (MreB-like), and MreBH, which have partially overlapping roles in cell morphogenesis; MreBH governs the localization of the cell-wall hydrolase LytE. MreB is not required for every form of non-spherical growth, however. Some actinobacteria, notably Mycobacterium and related genera such as Corynebacterium, grow mainly from their poles rather than through a canonical MreB-based lateral-wall system; this polar growth is organized by DivIVA-family proteins (called Wag31 in mycobacteria). A different exception occurs in pathogenic Chlamydia: rather than building a cylindrical sidewall, these obligate intracellular bacteria use MreB and PBP2 to organize localized peptidoglycan synthesis in a narrow mid-cell ring during cell division.

== See also ==
- Prokaryotic cytoskeleton
- FtsZ
- Crescentin
- Bacterial cell structure
- Peptidoglycan
