= Fission (biology) =

Biological process of division and regeneration

Binary fission of ciliate Colpidium, (a single-cell eukaryote)

In biology, fission is the division of a single entity into two or more parts and the regeneration of those parts to separate entities resembling the original. The object experiencing fission is usually a cell, but the term may also refer to how organisms, bodies, populations, or species split into discrete parts. The fission may be binary fission, in which a single organism produces two parts, or multiple fission, in which a single entity produces multiple parts.

== Binary fission ==
Schematic diagram of cellular growth (elongation) and binary fission of bacilli. Blue and red lines indicate old and newly generated bacterial cell wall, respectively. (1) growth at the centre of the bacterial body. e.g. Bacillus subtilis, E. coli, and others. (2) apical growth. e.g. Corynebacterium diphtheriae. This is bacterial proliferation.

Organisms in the domains of Archaea and Bacteria reproduce with binary fission. This form of asexual reproduction and cell division is also used by some organelles within eukaryotic organisms (e.g., mitochondria). Binary fission results in the reproduction of a living prokaryotic cell (or organelle) by dividing the cell into two parts, each with the potential to grow to the size of the original.

=== Fission of prokaryotes ===
The single DNA molecule first replicates, then attaches each copy to a different part of the cell membrane. When the cell begins to pull apart, the replicated and original chromosomes are separated. The consequence of this asexual method of reproduction is that all the cells are genetically identical, meaning that they have the same genetic material (barring random mutations). Unlike the processes of mitosis and meiosis used by eukaryotic cells, binary fission takes place without the formation of a spindle apparatus on the cell. Like in mitosis (and unlike in meiosis), the parental identity is not lost.

==== Fragmentation ====
Binary fission in a prokaryote

FtsZ is homologous to β-tubulin, the building block of the microtubule cytoskeleton used during mitosis in eukaryotes. FtsZ is thought to be the first protein to localize to the site of future division in bacteria, and it assembles into a Z ring, anchored by FtsZ-binding proteins and defines the division plane between the two daughter cells. MinC and MinD function together as division inhibitors, blocking formation of the FtsZ ring. MinE stops the MinCD activity midcell, allowing FtsZ to take over for binary fission.

More specifically, the following steps occur:

1. The bacterium before binary fission is when the DNA is tightly coiled.
2. The DNA of the bacterium has uncoiled and duplicated.
3. The DNA is pulled to the separate poles of the bacterium as it increases the size to prepare for splitting.
4. The growth of a new cell wall begins to separate the bacterium (triggered by FtsZ polymerization and "Z-ring" formation)
5. The new cell wall (septum) fully develops, resulting in the complete split of the bacterium.
6. The new daughter cells have tightly coiled DNA rods, ribosomes, and plasmids; these are now brand-new organisms.

Studies of bacteria made to not produce a cell wall, called L-form bacteria, indicate that FtsZ requires a cell wall to work. Little is known about how bacteria that naturally don't grow a cell wall divide, but it is thought to resemble the L-form's budding-like division process of extrusion and separation.

==== Speed of FtsZ-dependent Fission ====
Binary fission is generally rapid, though its speed varies between species. For E. coli, cells typically divide about every 20 minutes at 37 °C. Because the new cells will, in turn, undergo binary fission on their own, the time binary fission requires is also the time the bacterial culture requires to double in the number of cells it contains. This time period can, therefore, be referred to as the doubling time. Some species other than E. coli may have faster or slower doubling times: some strains of Mycobacterium tuberculosis may have doubling times of nearly 100 hours. Bacterial growth is limited by factors including nutrient availability and available space, so binary fission occurs at much lower rates in bacterial cultures once they enter the stationary phase of growth.

==== In archaea ====
Thermoproteota (formerly Crenarchaeota) possess neither a cell wall nor the FtsZ mechanism. They use a primitive version of the eukaryotic ESCRT-III system (also known as Cdv) to manipulate the membrane into separating, specifically by coming into the middle of the two soon-to-be daughter cells. Euryarchaeota use FtsZ like bacteria do.

=== Fission of organelles ===
Some organelles in eukaryotic cells reproduce using binary fission. Mitochondrial fission occurs frequently within the cell, even when the cell is not actively undergoing mitosis, and is necessary to regulate the cell's metabolism. All chloroplasts and some mitochondria (not in animals), both organelles derived from endosymbiosis of bacteria, also use FtsZ in a bacteria-like fashion.

=== Types of binary fission ===
Binary fission in organisms can occur in four ways: irregular, longitudinal, transverse, or oblique. For example:

1. Irregular: In this fission, cytokinesis may take place along any plane but it is always perpendicular to the plane of karyokinesis (nuclear division). e.g. Amoeba.
2. Longitudinal: Here cytokinesis takes place along the longitudinal axis. e.g. in flagellates like Euglena.
3. Transverse: Here cytokinesis takes place along the transverse axis. e.g. in ciliate protozoans like Paramecium.
4. Oblique: In this type of binary fission, cytokinesis occurs obliquely. Example Ceratium.

Binary fission means "division into two". It is the simplest and most common method of asexual reproduction.

== Multiple fission ==
=== Fission of protists ===
Multiple fission at the cellular level occurs in many protists, e.g. sporozoans and algae. The nucleus of the parent cell divides several times by amitosis, producing several nuclei. The cytoplasm then separates, creating multiple daughter cells.

Some parasitic, single-celled organisms undergo a multiple fission-like process to produce numerous daughter cells from a single parent cell. Isolates of the human parasite Blastocystis hominis were observed to begin such a process within 4 to 6 days. Cells of the fish parasite Trypanosoma borreli have also been observed participating in both binary and multiple fission.

==== Fission of apicomplexans ====
In the apicomplexans, a phylum of parasitic protists, multiple offspring are commonly produced through repeated nuclear division followed by coordinated budding and cytokinesis that partitions the cytoplasm into numerous daughter cells. This process is termed merogony when it produces merozoites, sporogony when it produces sporozoites, and microgametogony when it produces microgametes. Merozoites are multiple daughter cells that originate within the same cell membrane.

==== Fission of green algae ====
Green algae can divide into more than two daughter cells. The exact number of daughter cells depends on the species of algae and is an effect of temperature and light.

=== Multiple fission of bacteria ===
Most species of bacteria primarily undergo binary reproduction. Some species and groups of bacteria may undergo multiple fission as well, sometimes beginning or ending with the production of spores. The species Metabacterium polyspora, a symbiont of guinea pigs, has been found to produce multiple endospores in each division. Some species of cyanobacteria have also been found to reproduce through multiple fission.

== Plasmotomy ==
Some protozoans reproduce by yet another mechanism of fission called plasmotomy. In this type of fission, a multinucleate adult parent undergoes cytokinesis to form two multinucleate (or coenocytic) daughter cells. The daughter cells so produced undergo further mitosis.

Opalina and Pelomyxa reproduce in this way.

== Clonal fragmentation ==
Fragmentation in multicellular or colonial organisms is a form of asexual reproduction or cloning, where an organism is split into fragments. Each of these fragments develop into mature, fully grown individuals that are genetically identical clones of the original organism. In echinoderms, this method of reproduction is usually known as fissiparity.

== Population fission ==
Any splitting of a single population of individuals into discrete parts may be considered fission. A population may undergo fission process for a variety of reasons, including migration or geographic isolation. Since the fission leads to genetic variance in the newly isolated, smaller populations, population fission is a precursor to speciation.

== See also ==
- Cytokinesis – Final stage of cell division
- Cytoskeleton – Network of filamentous proteins that forms the internal framework of cells
- Divisome – Protein complex in bacteria responsible for cell division
- Fission-fusion society – Animal social organization type
- Mitochondrial fusion – Merging of two or more mitochondria within a cell to form a single compartment
- Mitosis – Cell division into two identical cells
- Paratomy – Form of asexual reproduction in animals
- Speciation – Evolutionary process
