= Divisome =

Protein complex in bacteria responsible for cell division

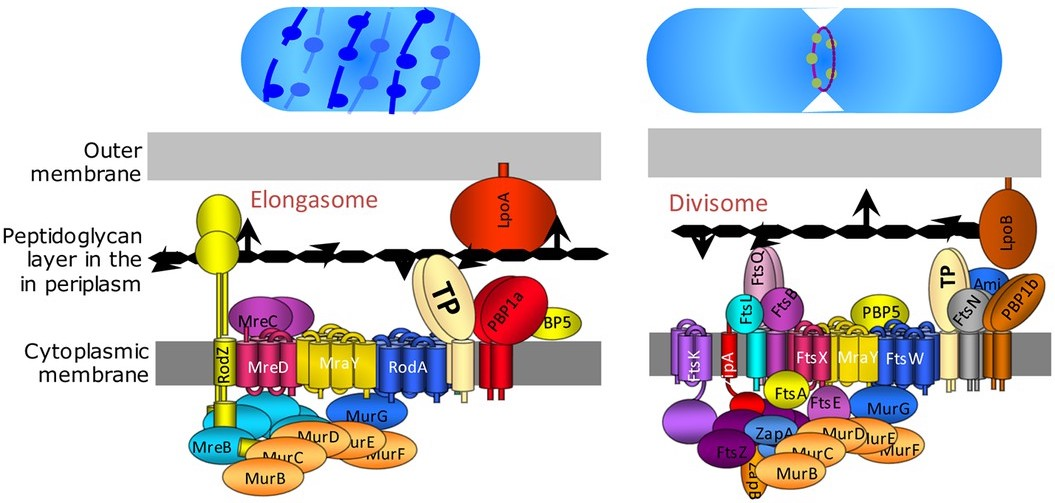
Divisome and elongasome complexes responsible for peptidoglycan synthesis during lateral cell-wall growth and division.

The divisome is a protein complex in bacteria that is responsible for cell division, constriction of inner and outer membranes during division, and peptidoglycan (PG) synthesis at the division site. The divisome is a membrane protein complex with proteins on both sides of the cytoplasmic membrane. In Gram-negative cells it is located in the inner membrane. The divisome is nearly ubiquitous in bacteria although its composition may vary between species.

The elongasome is a modified version of the divisome, without the membrane-constricting FtsZ-ring and its associated machinery. The elongasome is present only in non-spherical bacteria and directs lateral insertion of PG along the long axis of the cell, thus allowing cylindrical growth (as opposed to spherical growth, as in cocci).

== History ==
Some of the first cell-division genes of Escherichia coli were discovered by François Jacob's group in France in the 1960s. They were called fts genes, because mutants of these genes conferred a filamentous temperature-sensitive phenotype. At the non-permissive temperature (usually 42 °C), fts mutant cells continue to elongate without dividing, forming filaments that can be up to 150 $\mu$m long (as opposed to 2-3 $\mu$m in wild-type cells). Three breakthroughs came with the discovery of the ftsZ gene in 1980 and the realization that the FtsZ protein was localized to the division plane of dividing cells, and finally the realization that the structure of FtsZ is remarkably similar to tubulin and that they likely share a common ancestor.

== Composition ==
The precise composition of the divisome and elongasome remains unknown, given that they are highly dynamic protein complexes which recruit and release certain proteins during cell division. However, more than 20 proteins are known to be part of the divisome in E. coli with a similar number of proteins in Gram-positive bacteria (such as Bacillus subtilis), although not all proteins are conserved across bacteria.

Several other fts genes, such as ftsA, ftsW, ftsQ, ftsI, ftsL, ftsK, ftsN, and ftsB, were all found to be essential for cell division and to associate with the divisome complex and the FtsZ ring. FtsA protein binds directly to FtsZ in the cytoplasm, and FtsB, FtsL and FtsQ form an essential membrane-embedded subcomplex. FtsK and FtsW are larger proteins with multiple transmembrane domains. FtsI, also known as PBP3, is the divisome-specific transpeptidase required for synthesis of the division septum.

== DNA replication and cell division ==
DNA replication in bacteria is tightly linked to cell division. For instance, blocking replication in B. subtilis results in elongated cells without proper cell division. Bacterial DNA replication is initiated by the binding of DnaA (an ATPase) to the origin of replication (oriC) at midcell. FtsZ assembly appears to be linked to successful DNA replication with MatP and ZapB somehow coordinating interactions between the division machinery and DNA replication during chromosome segregation in E. coli.

== Assembly of the divisome ==
The precise assembly process of the divisome is not well understood. It starts with the early proteins FtsZ and its membrane anchor FtsA, and the proteins ZipA, EzrA, and the Zaps (ZapA, ZapB, ZapC, ZapD) which promote FtsZ ring-formation. While FtsA and especially FtsZ are highly conserved among bacteria, ZipA, which is a second membrane anchor for FtsZ in gamma-proteobacteria, EzrA, and the Zap proteins are less well conserved and are missing in some species. After the early proteins, the FtsQLB subcomplex is added, followed by FtsI (transpeptidase), FtsW (transglycosylase), and FtsN. Both FtsI and FtsW are required for synthesis of the septal wall. FtsW is related to the putative elongation-specific transglycosylase RodA, another divisome protein. FtsN appears to have several functions: it stabilizes the divisome (at least when over-expressed), acts as a trigger for cytokinesis (via interactions with FtsI and FtsW), and activates FtsA mediated recruitment of FtsQLB through direct binding of FtsA. However, while FtsA, FtsQLB, FtsI and FtsW are widely conserved, FtsN is limited to Gram-negative organisms (such as E. coli) and hence is not universally required.

== The mitochondrial (eukaryotic) divisome ==
A protein complex that orchestrates division of eukaryotic mitochondria has been called the "mitochondrial divisome". It is conceptually and operationally similar to the bacterial cell-division machinery but consists (mostly) of different proteins. However, there seem to be some conserved aspects, e.g. in the red alga Cyanidioschyzon merolae, a mitochondrial FtsZ protein partially constricts the organelle, which enables the dynamin homologue Dnm1 to assemble with the mitochondrion-dividing (MD) ring on the cytosolic face to induce fission. Dictyostelium discoideum also has two FtsZ homologs, FszA and FszB, that participate in mitochondrial fission in that organism. However, in many eukaryotes (including yeasts and animals), the divisome functions in the complete absence of the contractile FtsZ ring.

== See also ==
- Fission (biology) – Biological process of division and regeneration
