= MinE =

The MinE protein is one of three proteins of the Min system encoded by the minB operon required to generate pole to pole oscillations prior to bacterial cell division as a means of specifying the midzone of the cell, as seen in E.coli.

== History ==
MinE was initially thought to assemble as a static ring at the cell center, thereby preventing the MinCD inhibition complex from localizing and binding there and instead influencing the complex to occupy each bacterial pole. Raskin and de Boer later revealed a dynamic interaction of the Min proteins, where the unstable interaction between the proteins resulted in pole to pole oscillations, resulting in lower concentrations of MinCD complex at the cell center.

== Function ==
MinE is a topological specificity factor that counters the activity of MinCD division inhibitor at the mid-cell division site. MinE functions as a dimer and will bind to membrane-bound MinCD complex, altering its binding dynamics. MinE has membrane binding activity and can also interact with MinD only when on the membrane, suggesting a conformational change in MinD upon interacting with phospholipids that makes it vulnerable to MinE activity. MinE both positively and negatively regulates MinD interaction with membrane.

Deletion analysis has revealed that there exist two domains of interest in MinE, each with separate function. The N-Terminal domain contains the anti-MinCD domain that is necessary and sufficient to interact with MinD and counteract the MinCD-mediated division inhibition and to stimulate the ATPase activity of MinD, resulting in MinD's detachment from the membrane after ATP hydrolysis. MinE is also known to form a ring near each pole. The purpose of this ring structure is to catalyze the release of membrane-bound MinD in turn, imparting regional specificity of Min protein localization.

=== Structure ===
Nuclear Magnetic Resonance (NMR) spectroscopy of truncated MinE revealed a long alpha-helix as well as two anti-parallel beta-strands. These structures are hypothesized to mediate the homodimerization by interaction of alpha/beta structures. These structural studies also support the theory that the MinE ring structure may actually form a multimeric filamentous structure as a function of the interaction of these alpha and beta units. It has also been hypothesized that MinE may potentially form higher order structures, and may not simply be limited to ring formation.

Additional structural study and molecular imaging is needed to elucidate the higher order polymerization structures of MinE and to determine their dynamics on the remaining Min system. Recently, computational models have been applied to explore the limits of this system.
