= FtsZ =

Protein encoded by the ftsZ gene

Cell division protein FtsZ

Identifiers
- Symbol: FtsZ
- InterPro: IPR000158
- CATH: 1fsz
- SCOP2: 1fsz / SCOPe / SUPFAM
- CDD: cd02201
Available protein structures:
- PDB: IPR000158
- AlphaFold: IPR000158

FtsZ, C-terminal sandwich

Identifiers
- Symbol: FtsZ_C
- Pfam: PF12327
- InterPro: IPR024757
Available protein structures:
- PDB: IPR024757 PF12327 (ECOD; PDBsum)
- AlphaFold: IPR024757; PF12327

Cell division protein FtsZ
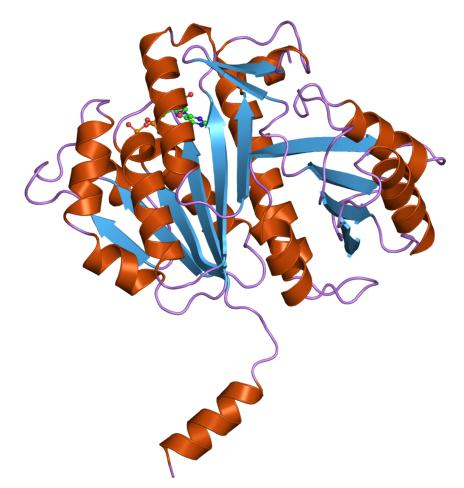
- Molecular Structure of FtsZ (PDB 1fsz).

Identifiers
- Organism: Escherichia coli
- Symbol: ftsZ
- Orthologs: OMA: entry
- UniProt: P0A9A6
Search for
- Structures: Swiss-model
- Domains: InterPro

FtsZ is a protein encoded by the ftsZ gene that assembles into a ring at the future site of bacterial cell division (also called the Z ring). FtsZ is a prokaryotic homologue of the eukaryotic protein tubulin. The initials FtsZ mean "Filamenting temperature-sensitive mutant Z." The hypothesis was that cell division mutants of E. coli would grow as filaments due to the inability of the daughter cells to separate from one another. FtsZ is found in almost all bacteria, many archaea, all chloroplasts and some mitochondria, where it is essential for cell division. FtsZ assembles the cytoskeletal scaffold of the Z ring that, along with additional proteins, constricts to divide the cell in two.

== History ==
In the 1960s scientists screened for temperature sensitive mutations that blocked cell division at 42 °C. The mutant cells divided normally at 30°, but failed to divide at 42°. Continued growth without division produced long filamentous cells (Filamenting temperature sensitive). Several such mutants were discovered and mapped to a locus originally named ftsA, which could be one or more genes. In 1980 Lutkenhaus and Donachie showed that several of these mutations mapped to one gene, ftsA, but one well-characterized mutant, PAT84, originally discovered by Hirota et al, mapped to a separate, adjacent gene. They named this cell division gene ftsZ. In 1991 Bi and Lutkenhaus used immunogold electron microscopy to show that FtsZ localized to the invaginating septum at midcell. Subsequently, the Losick and Margolin groups used immuno-fluorescence microscopy and GFP fusions to show that FtsZ assembled Z rings early in the cell cycle, well before the septum began to constrict. Other division proteins then assemble onto the Z ring and constriction occurs in the last part of the cell cycle.

In 1992-3 three labs independently discovered that FtsZ was related to eukaryotic tubulin, which is the protein subunit that assembles into microtubules. This was the first discovery that bacteria have homologs of eukaryotic cytoskeletal proteins. Later work showed that FtsZ was present in, and essential for, cell division in almost all bacteria and in many but not all archaea.

Mitochondria and chloroplasts are eukaryotic organelles that originated as bacterial endosymbionts, so there was much interest in whether they use FtsZ for division. Chloroplast FtsZ was first discovered by Osteryoung, and it is now known that all chloroplasts use FtsZ for division. Mitochondrial FtsZ was discovered by Beech in an alga; FtsZ is used for mitochondrial division in some eukaryotes, while others have replaced it with a dynamin-based machinery.

In 2014, scientists identified two FtsZ homologs in archaea, FtsZ1 and FtsZ2.

== Function ==
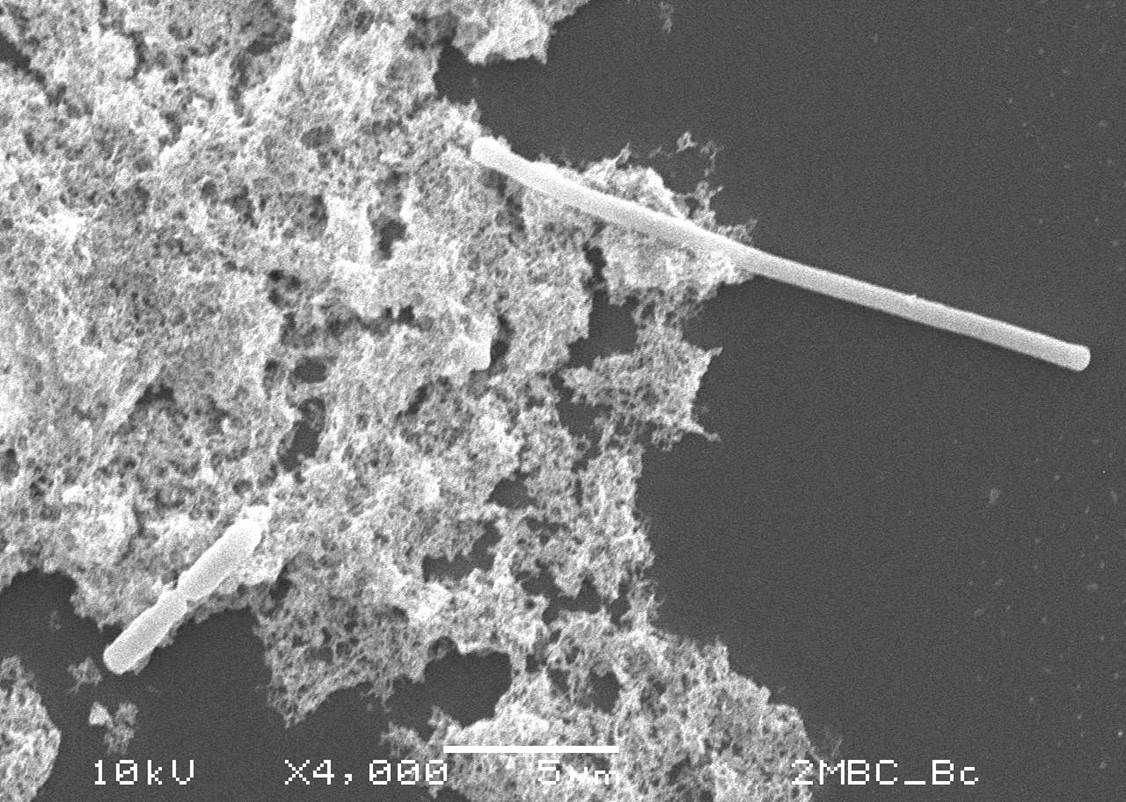
Inhibition of FtsZ disrupts septum formation, resulting in filamentation of bacterial cells (top right of electron micrograph).

During cell division, FtsZ is the first protein to move to the division site, and is essential for recruiting other proteins that produce a new cell wall (septum) between the dividing cells. FtsZ's role in cell division is analogous to that of actin in eukaryotic cell division, but, unlike the actin-myosin ring in eukaryotes, FtsZ has no known motor protein associated with it. Cell wall synthesis may externally push the cell membrane, providing the force for cytokinesis. Supporting this, in E. coli the rate of division is affected by mutations in cell wall synthesis. Alternatively, FtsZ may pull the membrane from the inside based on Osawa (2009) showing the protein's contractile force on liposomes with no other proteins present.

Erickson (2009) proposed how the roles of tubulin-like proteins and actin-like proteins in cell division became reversed in an evolutionary mystery. The use of the FtsZ ring in dividing chloroplasts and some mitochondria further establishes their prokaryotic ancestry. L-form bacteria that lack a cell wall do not require FtsZ for division, which implies that bacteria may have retained components of an ancestral mode of cell division.

Much is known about the dynamic polymerization activities of tubulin and microtubules, but little is known about these activities in FtsZ. While it is known that single-stranded tubulin protofilaments form into 13 stranded microtubules, the multistranded structure of the FtsZ-containing Z-ring is not known. It is only speculated that the structure consists of overlapping protofilaments. Nevertheless, recent work with purified FtsZ on supported lipid bilayers as well as imaging FtsZ in living bacterial cells revealed that FtsZ protofilaments have polarity and move in one direction by treadmilling (see also below).

Recently, proteins similar to tubulin and FtsZ have been discovered in large plasmids found in Bacillus species. They are believed to function as components of segrosomes, which are multiprotein complexes that partition chromosomes/plasmids in bacteria. The plasmid homologs of tubulin/FtsZ seem to have conserved the ability to polymerize into filaments.

=== The contractile ring (the "Z ring") ===
The Z-ring forms from smaller subunits of FtsZ filaments. These filaments may pull on each other and tighten to divide the cell.

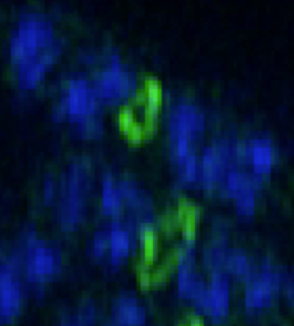
Super-resolution image of Z-rings (green) at different stages of constriction in two E. coli cells.

FtsZ can bind to GTP and also exhibits a GTPase domain that allows it to hydrolyze GTP to GDP and a phosphate group. In vivo, FtsZ forms filaments with a repeating arrangement of subunits, all arranged head-to-tail. These filaments form a ring around the longitudinal midpoint, or septum, of the cell. This ring is called the Z-ring.

The GTP hydrolysis activity of the protein is not essential to the formation of filaments or cell division. Mutants defective in GTPase activity often still divide, but sometimes form twisted and disordered septa. It is unclear whether FtsZ actually provides the physical force that results in division or serves as a scaffold for other proteins to execute division.

There are two models for how FtsZ might generate a constriction force. One model is based on the observation that FtsZ protfilaments can be straight or curved. The transition from straight to curved is suggested to generate a bending force on the membrane. Another model is based on sliding protofilaments. Computer models and in vivo measurements suggest that single FtsZ filaments cannot sustain a length more than 30 subunits long. In this model, FtsZ scission force comes from the relative lateral movement of subunits. Lines of FtsZ would line up together parallel and pull on each other creating a "cord" of many strings that tightens itself.

In other models, FtsZ does not provide the contractile force but provides the cell a spatial scaffold for other proteins to execute the division of the cell. This is akin to the creating of a temporary structure by construction workers to access hard-to-reach places of a building. The temporary structure allows unfettered access and ensures that the workers can reach all places. If the temporary structure is not correctly built, the workers will not be able to reach certain places, and the building will be deficient.

The scaffold theory is supported by information that shows that the formation of the ring and localization to the membrane requires the concerted action of a number of accessory proteins. ZipA or the actin homologue FtsA permit initial FtsZ localization to the membrane. Following localization to the membrane, division proteins of the Fts family are recruited for ring assembly. Many of these proteins direct the synthesis of the new division septum at midcell (FtsI, FtsW), or regulate the activity of this synthesis (FtsQ, FtsL, FtsB, FtsN). The timing of Z-ring formation suggests the possibility of a spatial or temporal signal that permits the formation of FtsZ filaments.

Recent super-resolution imaging in several species supports a dynamic scaffold model, in which small clusters of FtsZ protofilaments or protofilament bundles move unidirectionally around the ring's circumference by treadmilling, anchored to the membrane by FtsA and other FtsZ-specific membrane tethers. The speed of treadmilling depends on the rate of GTP hydrolysis within the FtsZ protofilaments, but in Escherichia coli, synthesis of the division septum remains the rate limiting step for cytokinesis. The treadmilling action of FtsZ is required for proper synthesis of the division septum by septal peptidoglycan synthesis enzymes, suggesting that these enzymes can track the growing ends of the filaments.

=== Septal localization and intracellular signaling ===
The formation of the Z-ring closely coincides with cellular processes associated with replication. Z-ring formation coincides with the termination of genome replication in E. coli and 70% of chromosomal replication in B. subtilis. The timing of Z-ring formation suggests the possibility of a spatial or temporal signal that permits the formation of FtsZ filaments. In Escherichia coli, at least two negative regulators of FtsZ assembly form a bipolar gradient, such that the concentration of active FtsZ required for FtsZ assembly is highest at mid-cell between the two segregating chromosomes, and lowest at the poles and over the chromosomes. This type of regulation seems to occur in other species such as Bacillus subtilis and Caulobacter crescentus. However, other species including Streptococcus pneumoniae and Myxococcus xanthus seem to use positive regulators that stimulate FtsZ assembly at mid-cell.

=== Responding to DNA damage ===
FtsZ polymerization is also linked to stressors like DNA damage. DNA damage induces a variety of proteins to be manufactured, one of them called SulA. SulA prevents the polymerization and GTPase activity of FtsZ. SulA accomplishes this task by binding to self-recognizing FtsZ sites. By sequestering FtsZ, the cell can directly link DNA damage to inhibiting cell division.

=== Preventing DNA damage ===
Like SulA, there are other mechanisms that prevent cell division that would result in disrupted genetic information sent to daughter cells. So far, two proteins have been identified in E. coli and B. subtilis that prevent division over the nucleoid region: Noc and SlmA. Noc gene knockouts result in cells that divide without respect to the nucleoid region, resulting in its asymmetrical partitioning between the daughter cells. The mechanism is not well understood, but thought to involve sequestration of FtsZ, preventing polymerization over the nucleoid region. The mechanism used by SlmA to inhibit FtsZ polymerization over the nucleoid is better understood, and uses two separate steps. One domain of SlmA binds to a FtsZ polymer, then a separate domain of SlmA severs the polymer. A similar mechanism is thought to be used by MinC, another inhibitor of FtsZ polymerization involved in positioning of the FtsZ ring.

== Clinical significance ==
The number of multidrug-resistant bacterial strains is currently increasing; thus, the determination of drug targets for the development of novel antimicrobial drugs is urgently needed. The potential role of FtsZ in the blockage of cell division, together with its high degree of conservation across bacterial species, makes FtsZ a highly attractive target for developing novel antibiotics. Researchers have been working on synthetic molecules and natural products as inhibitors of FtsZ.

The spontaneous self-assembly of FtsZ can also be used in nanotechnology to fabricate metal nanowires.

== See also ==
- Fission (biology) – Biological process of division and regeneration
- Divisome – Protein complex in bacteria responsible for cell division
- FtsK – Protein involved in bacterial cell division
