= Bacterial cell structure =

Specialized anatomy and physiology of bacteria

Bacteria, despite apparent simplicity, have highly organized and efficient cell structures, which allow them to fill many ecological niches. While resembling other prokaryotes, many features of bacterial cells are unique to bacteria, and not found among archaea or eukaryotes.

Bacterial cells have fewer components than eukarotic cells, and are often easier to manipulate experimentally relative to eukaryotes. Therefore, many biochemical principles were first characterized in bacteria before these principles were subsequently applied to other organisms.

== Cell morphology ==
Bacteria come in a wide variety of shapes.

Bacterial species often have morphologies (shapes), which can be highly distinct from one another. These morphologies have been traditionally important to the identification, naming, and classification of bacteria. Typical examples include:

- coccus (circle or spherical)
- bacillus (rod-like)
- coccobacillus (between a sphere and a rod)
- spiral (corkscrew-like)
- filamentous (elongated)

Cell shape is generally characteristic of a given bacterial species, but can vary depending on growth conditions. Some bacteria have complex life cycles involving the production of stalks and appendages (e.g. Caulobacter) and some produce elaborate structures bearing reproductive spores (e.g. Myxococcus, Streptomyces). Bacteria generally form distinctive cell morphologies when examined by light microscopy and distinct colony morphologies when grown on Petri plates.

Perhaps the most obvious structural characteristic of bacteria is (with some exceptions) their small size. For example, Escherichia coli cells, an "average" sized bacterium, are about 2 μm (micrometres) long and 0.5 μm in diameter, with a cell volume of 0.6–0.7 μm^{3}. This corresponds to a wet mass of about 1 picogram (pg), assuming that the cell consists mostly of water. The dry mass of a single cell can be estimated as 23% of the wet mass, amounting to 0.2 pg. About half of the dry mass of a bacterial cell consists of carbon, and also about half of it can be attributed to proteins. Therefore, a typical fully grown 1-liter culture of Escherichia coli (at an optical density of 1.0, corresponding to c. 10^{9} cells/ml) yields about 1 g wet cell mass. Small size is extremely important because it allows for a large surface area-to-volume ratio which allows for rapid uptake and intracellular distribution of nutrients and excretion of wastes. At low surface area-to-volume ratios the diffusion of nutrients and waste products across the bacterial cell membrane limits the rate at which microbial metabolism can occur, making the cell less evolutionarily fit. The reason for the existence of large cells is unknown, although it is speculated that the increased cell volume is used primarily for storage of excess nutrients.

Comparison of a typical bacterial cell and a typical human cell (assuming both cells are spheres) :

	Bacterial cell	Human cell	Comparison
Diameter	1μm	10μm	Bacterium is 10 times smaller.
Surface area	3.1μm^{2}	314μm^{2}	Bacterium is 100 times smaller.
Volume	0.52μm^{3}	524μm^{3}	Bacterium is 1000 times smaller.
Surface-to-volume ratio	6	0.6	Bacterium is 10 times greater.

== Cell wall ==
The structure of peptidoglycan

Bacterial cell walls

The cell envelope is composed of the cell membrane and the cell wall. As in other organisms, the bacterial cell wall provides structural integrity to the cell. In prokaryotes, the primary function of the cell wall is to protect the cell from internal turgor pressure caused by the much higher concentrations of proteins and other molecules inside the cell compared to its external environment. The bacterial cell wall differs from that of all other organisms by the presence of peptidoglycan which is located immediately outside of the cell membrane. Peptidoglycan is made up of a polysaccharide backbone consisting of alternating N-Acetylmuramic acid (NAM) and N-acetylglucosamine (NAG) residues in equal amounts. Peptidoglycan is responsible for the rigidity of the bacterial cell wall, and for the determination of cell shape. It is relatively porous and is not considered to be a permeability barrier for small substrates. While all bacterial cell walls (with a few exceptions such as extracellular parasites such as Mycoplasma) contain peptidoglycan, not all cell walls have the same overall structures. Since the cell wall is required for bacterial survival, but is absent in some eukaryotes, several antibiotics (notably the penicillins and cephalosporins) stop bacterial infections by interfering with cell wall synthesis, while having no effects on human cells which have no cell wall, only a cell membrane. There are two main types of bacterial cell walls, those of gram-positive bacteria and those of gram-negative bacteria, which are differentiated by their Gram staining characteristics. For both these types of bacteria, particles of approximately 2 nm can pass through the peptidoglycan. If the bacterial cell wall is entirely removed, it is called a protoplast while if it's partially removed, it is called a spheroplast. Beta-lactam antibiotics such as penicillin inhibit the formation of peptidoglycan cross-links in the bacterial cell wall. The enzyme lysozyme, found in human tears, also digests the cell wall of bacteria and is the body's main defense against eye infections.

=== Gram-positive cell wall ===
Gram-positive cell walls are thick and the peptidoglycan (also known as murein) layer constitutes almost 95% of the cell wall in some gram-positive bacteria and as little as 5-10% of the cell wall in gram-negative bacteria. The peptidoglycan layer takes up the crystal violet dye and stains purple in the Gram stain. Bacteria within the Deinococcota group may also exhibit gram-positive staining but contain some cell wall structures typical of gram-negative bacteria.

The cell wall of some gram-positive bacteria can be completely dissolved by lysozymes which attack the bonds between N-acetylmuramic acid and N-acetylglucosamine. In other gram-positive bacteria, such as Staphylococcus aureus, the walls are resistant to the action of lysozymes. They have O-acetyl groups on carbon-6 of some muramic acid residues. The matrix substances in the walls of gram-positive bacteria may be polysaccharides or teichoic acids. The latter are very widespread, but have been found only in gram-positive bacteria. There are two main types of teichoic acid: ribitol teichoic acids and glycerol teichoic acids. The latter one is more widespread. These acids are polymers of ribitol phosphate and glycerol phosphate, respectively, and only located on the surface of many gram-positive bacteria. However, the exact function of teichoic acid is debated and not fully understood. Some are lipid-linked to form lipoteichoic acids. Because lipoteichoic acids are covalently linked to lipids within the cytoplasmic membrane they are responsible for linking and anchoring the peptidoglycan to the cytoplasmic membrane. Lipotechoic acid is a major component of the gram-positive cell wall. One of its purposes is providing an antigenic function. The lipid element is to be found in the membrane where its adhesive properties assist in its anchoring to the membrane. Teichoic acids give the gram-positive cell wall an overall negative charge due to the presence of phosphodiester bonds between teichoic acid monomers.

Outside the cell wall, many gram-positive bacteria have an S-layer of "tiled" proteins. The S-layer assists attachment and biofilm formation. Outside the S-layer, there is often a capsule of polysaccharides. The capsule helps the bacterium evade host phagocytosis. In laboratory culture, the S-layer and capsule are often lost by reductive evolution (the loss of a trait in absence of positive selection).

=== Gram-negative cell wall ===
Gram-negative cell walls are much thinner than the gram-positive cell walls, and they contain a second plasma membrane superficial to their thin peptidoglycan layer, in turn adjacent to the cytoplasmic membrane. Gram-negative bacteria stain as pink in the Gram stain. The chemical structure of the outer membrane's lipopolysaccharide is often unique to specific bacterial sub-species and is responsible for many of the antigenic properties of these strains.

In addition to the peptidoglycan layer the gram-negative cell wall also contains an additional outer membrane composed of phospholipids and lipopolysaccharides which face into the external environment. The highly charged nature of lipopolysaccharides confer an overall negative charge to the gram -negative cell wall. The chemical structure of the outer membrane lipopolysaccharides is often unique to specific bacterial strains, and is responsible for many of their antigenic properties.

As a phospholipid bilayer, the lipid portion of the outer membrane is largely impermeable to all charged molecules. However, channels called porins are present in the outer membrane that allow for passive transport of many ions, sugars and amino acids across the outer membrane. These molecules are therefore present in the periplasm, the region between the plasma membrane and outer membrane. The periplasm contains the peptidoglycan layer and many proteins responsible for substrate binding or hydrolysis and reception of extracellular signals. The periplasm is thought to exist as a gel-like state rather than a liquid due to the high concentration of proteins and peptidoglycan found within it. Because of its location between the cytoplasmic and outer membranes, signals received and substrates bound are available to be transported across the cytoplasmic membrane using transport and signaling proteins imbedded there.

Many uncultivated gram-negative bacteria also have an S-layer and a capsule. These structures are often lost during laboratory cultivation.

== Plasma membrane ==
The plasma membrane or bacterial cytoplasmic membrane is composed of a phospholipid bilayer and thus has all of the general functions of a cell membrane such as acting as a permeability barrier for most molecules and serving as the location for the transport of molecules into the cell. In addition to these functions, prokaryotic membranes also function in energy conservation as the location about which a proton motive force is generated. Unlike eukaryotes, bacterial membranes (with some exceptions e.g. Mycoplasma and methanotrophs) generally do not contain sterols. However, many microbes do contain structurally related compounds called hopanoids which likely fulfill the same function. Unlike eukaryotes, bacteria can have a wide variety of fatty acids within their membranes. Along with typical saturated and unsaturated fatty acids, bacteria can contain fatty acids with additional methyl, hydroxy or even cyclic groups. The relative proportions of these fatty acids can be modulated by the bacterium to maintain the optimum fluidity of the membrane (e.g. following temperature change).

Gram-negative and mycobacteria have an inner and outer bacteria membrane. As a phospholipid bilayer, the lipid portion of the bacterial outer membrane is impermeable to charged molecules. However, channels called porins are present in the outer membrane that allow for passive transport of many ions, sugars and amino acids across the outer membrane. These molecules are therefore present in the periplasm, the region between the cytoplasmic and outer membranes. The periplasm contains the peptidoglycan layer and many proteins responsible for substrate binding or hydrolysis and reception of extracellular signals. The periplasm is thought to exist in a gel-like state rather than a liquid due to the high concentration of proteins and peptidoglycan found within it. Because of its location between the cytoplasmic and outer membranes, signals received and substrates bound are available to be transported across the cytoplasmic membrane using transport and signaling proteins imbedded there.

== Extracellular structures ==
=== Fimbriae and pili ===
Fimbriae (sometimes called "attachment pili") are protein tubes that extend out from the outer membrane in many members of the Pseudomonadota. They are generally short in length and present in high numbers about the entire bacterial cell surface. Fimbriae usually function to facilitate the attachment of a bacterium to a surface (e.g. to form a biofilm) or to other cells (e.g. animal cells during pathogenesis). A few organisms (e.g. Myxococcus) use fimbriae for motility to facilitate the assembly of multicellular structures such as fruiting bodies. Pili are similar in structure to fimbriae but are much longer and present on the bacterial cell in low numbers. Pili are involved in the process of bacterial conjugation where they are called conjugation pili or "sex pili". Type IV pili (non-sex pili) also aid bacteria in gripping surfaces.

=== S-layers ===
An S-layer (surface layer) is a cell surface protein layer found in many different bacteria and in some archaea, where it serves as the cell wall. All S-layers are made up of a two-dimensional array of proteins and have a crystalline appearance, the symmetry of which differs between species. The exact function of S-layers is unknown, but it has been suggested that they act as a partial permeability barrier for large substrates. For example, an S-layer could conceivably keep extracellular proteins near the cell membrane by preventing their diffusion away from the cell. In some pathogenic species, an S-layer may help to facilitate survival within the host by conferring protection against host defence mechanisms.

=== Glycocalyx ===
Many bacteria secrete extracellular polymers outside of their cell walls called glycocalyx. These polymers are usually composed of polysaccharides and sometimes protein. Capsules are relatively impermeable structures that cannot be stained with dyes such as India ink. They are structures that help protect bacteria from phagocytosis and desiccation. Slime layer is involved in attachment of bacteria to other cells or inanimate surfaces to form biofilms. Slime layers can also be used as a food reserve for the cell.

A-Monotrichous; B-Lophotrichous; C-Amphitrichous; D-Peritrichous

=== Flagella ===
Perhaps the most recognizable extracellular bacterial cell structures are flagella. Flagella are whip-like structures protruding from the bacterial cell wall and are responsible for bacterial motility (movement). The arrangement of flagella about the bacterial cell is unique to the species observed. Common forms include:

- Atrichous - Lacking flagella
- Monotrichous – Single flagellum
- Lophotrichous – A tuft of flagella found at one of the cell poles
- Amphitrichous – Single flagellum found at each of two opposite poles
- Peritrichous – Multiple flagella found at several locations about the cell

The bacterial flagellum consists of three basic components: a whip-like filament, a motor complex, and a hook that connects them. The filament is approximately 20 nm in diameter and consists of several protofilaments, each made up of thousands of flagellin subunits. The bundle is held together by a cap and may or may not be encapsulated. The motor complex consists of a series of rings anchoring the flagellum in the inner and outer membranes, followed by a proton-driven motor that drives rotational movement in the filament. Unlike eukaryotic flagella, which are large membrane extensions, the bacterial flagella are composed of proteins.

== Intracellular structures ==
Cell structure of a gram positive bacterium

Bacterial cells are typically smaller than eukaryotic cells with a far smaller internal volume. Therefore, bacteria often have far more streamlined internal contents. Bacteria typically do not typically contain eukaryotic membrane-bound organelles, but contain other small but complex intracellular structures.

=== Bacterial DNA: Chromsomes and Plasmids ===
Unlike eukaryotes, the bacterial DNA is not enclosed inside of a membrane-bound nucleus but instead resides inside the cytoplasm. The processes concerning the central dogma all occur in the same compartment. Therefore, the processes of transcription and translation can occur simultaneously. Bacterial DNA typically occurs in one of two kinds of molecules:

- Bacterial chromosomes, located in the irregularly shaped region known as the nucleoid
- Extrachromosomal DNA, located outside of the nucleoid region as circular or linear plasmids

The chromosomal DNA of bacteria is not packaged using histones to form chromatin as in eukaryotes but instead is bound by Nucleoid Associated Proteins. Most bacterial chromosomes are circular as opposed to the linear chromosomes of eukaryotes. Like eukaryotic chromosomes, bacterial chromosomes are typically heavily supercoiled. Some examples of linear chromosomes exist (e.g. Borrelia burgdorferi). Usually, a single bacterial chromosome is present, although some species with multiple chromosomes have been described.

Plasmids are small, typically circular extrasomal DNAs that many bacteria contain. Plasmids often encode traits that may be advantageous like resistance to toxins, but they are typically not essential to function of the bacterial cell. Plasmids can be easily gained or lost by bacteria and can be transferred between cells as a form of horizontal gene transfer.

=== Ribosomes and other multiprotein complexes ===
In most bacteria the most numerous intracellular structure is the ribosome, the site of protein synthesis in all living organisms. All prokaryotes have 70S (where S=Svedberg units) ribosomes while eukaryotes contain larger 80S ribosomes in their cytosol. The 70S ribosome is made up of a 50S and 30S subunits. The 50S subunit contains the 23S and 5S rRNA while the 30S subunit contains the 16S rRNA. These rRNA molecules differ in size in eukaryotes and are complexed with a large number of ribosomal proteins, the number and type of which can vary slightly between organisms. While the ribosome is the most commonly observed intracellular multiprotein complex in bacteria other large complexes do occur and can sometimes be seen using microscopy.

=== Intracellular membranes ===
While not typical of all bacteria, some microbes contain intracellular membranes in addition to (or as extensions of) their cytoplasmic membranes. An early idea was that bacteria might contain membrane folds termed mesosomes, but these were later shown to be artifacts produced by the chemicals used to prepare the cells for electron microscopy. Examples of bacteria containing intracellular membranes are phototrophs (ex.: thylakoid), nitrifying bacteria (ex.: anammoxosome) and methane-oxidising bacteria such as the methylococcaceae. Intracellular membranes are also found in bacteria belonging to the poorly studied Planctomycetota group, although these membranes more closely resemble organellar membranes in eukaryotes and are currently of unknown function. Chromatophores are intracellular membranes found in phototrophic bacteria. Used primarily for photosynthesis, they contain bacteriochlorophyll pigments and carotenoids.

=== Cytoskeleton ===
The prokaryotic cytoskeleton is the collective name for all structural filaments in prokaryotes. It was once thought that prokaryotic cells did not possess cytoskeletons, but advances in imaging technology and structure determination have shown the presence of filaments in these cells. Homologues for all major cytoskeletal proteins in eukaryotes have been found in prokaryotes. Cytoskeletal elements play essential roles in cell division, protection, shape determination, and polarity determination in various prokaryotes.

=== Nutrient storage structures ===
Most bacteria do not live in environments that contain large amounts of nutrients at all times. To accommodate these transient levels of nutrients, bacteria contain several different methods of nutrient storage in times of plenty for use in times of want. For example, many bacteria store excess carbon in the form of polyhydroxyalkanoates or glycogen. Some microbes store soluble nutrients such as nitrate in vacuoles. Sulfur is most often stored as elemental (S^{0}) granules which can be deposited either intra- or extracellularly. Sulfur granules are especially common in bacteria that use hydrogen sulfide as an electron source. Most of the above-mentioned examples can be viewed using a microscope and are surrounded by a thin nonunit membrane to separate them from the cytoplasm.

==== Inclusions ====
Inclusions are considered to be nonliving components of the cell that do not possess metabolic activity and are not bounded by membranes. The most common inclusions are glycogen, lipid droplets, crystals, and pigments. Volutin granules are cytoplasmic inclusions of complexed inorganic polyphosphate. These granules are called metachromatic granules due to their displaying the metachromatic effect; they appear red or blue when stained with the blue dyes methylene blue or toluidine blue.

==== Gas vacuoles ====
Gas vacuoles are membrane-bound, spindle-shaped vesicles, found in some planktonic bacteria and Cyanobacteria, that provides buoyancy to these cells by decreasing their overall cell density. Positive buoyancy is needed to keep the cells in the upper reaches of the water column, so that they can continue to perform photosynthesis. They are made up of a shell of protein that has a highly hydrophobic inner surface, making it impermeable to water (and stopping water vapour from condensing inside) but permeable to most gases. Because the gas vesicle is a hollow cylinder, it is liable to collapse when the surrounding pressure increases. Natural selection has fine tuned the structure of the gas vesicle to maximise its resistance to buckling, including an external strengthening protein, GvpC, rather like the green thread in a braided hosepipe. There is a simple relationship between the diameter of the gas vesicle and pressure at which it will collapse – the wider the gas vesicle the weaker it becomes. However, wider gas vesicles are more efficient, providing more buoyancy per unit of protein than narrow gas vesicles. Different species produce gas vesicle of different diameter, allowing them to colonise different depths of the water column (fast growing, highly competitive species with wide gas vesicles in the top most layers; slow growing, dark-adapted, species with strong narrow gas vesicles in the deeper layers). The diameter of the gas vesicle will also help determine which species survive in different bodies of water. Deep lakes that experience winter mixing expose the cells to the hydrostatic pressure generated by the full water column. This will select for species with narrower, stronger gas vesicles.

The cell achieves its height in the water column by synthesising gas vesicles. As the cell rises up, it is able to increase its carbohydrate load through increased photosynthesis. Too high and the cell will suffer photobleaching and possible death, however, the carbohydrate produced during photosynthesis increases the cell's density, causing it to sink. The daily cycle of carbohydrate build-up from photosynthesis and carbohydrate catabolism during dark hours is enough to fine-tune the cell's position in the water column, bring it up toward the surface when its carbohydrate levels are low and it needs to photosynthesis, and allowing it to sink away from the harmful UV radiation when the cell's carbohydrate levels have been replenished. An extreme excess of carbohydrate causes a significant change in the internal pressure of the cell, which causes the gas vesicles to buckle and collapse and the cell to sink out.

==== Microcompartments ====
Bacterial microcompartments are widespread, organelle-like structures that are made of a protein shell that surrounds and encloses various enzymes. provide a further level of organization; they are compartments within bacteria that are surrounded by polyhedral protein shells, rather than by lipid membranes. These "polyhedral organelles" localize and compartmentalize bacterial metabolism, a function performed by the membrane-bound organelles in eukaryotes.

===== Carboxysomes =====
Carboxysomes are bacterial microcompartments found in many autotrophic bacteria such as Cyanobacteria, Knallgasbacteria, Nitroso- and Nitrobacteria. They are proteinaceous structures resembling phage heads in their morphology and contain the enzymes of carbon dioxide fixation in these organisms (especially ribulose bisphosphate carboxylase/oxygenase, RuBisCO, and carbonic anhydrase). It is thought that the high local concentration of the enzymes along with the fast conversion of bicarbonate to carbon dioxide by carbonic anhydrase allows faster and more efficient carbon dioxide fixation than possible inside the cytoplasm. Similar structures are known to harbor the coenzyme B12-containing glycerol dehydratase, the key enzyme of glycerol fermentation to 1,3-propanediol, in some Enterobacteriaceae (e. g. Salmonella).

===== Magnetosomes =====
Magnetosomes are bacterial microcompartments found in magnetotactic bacteria that allow them to sense and align themselves along a magnetic field (magnetotaxis). The ecological role of magnetotaxis is unknown but is thought to be involved in the determination of optimal oxygen concentrations. Magnetosomes are composed of the mineral magnetite or greigite and are surrounded by a lipid bilayer membrane. The morphology of magnetosomes is species-specific.

== Endospores ==
Perhaps the best known bacterial adaptation to stress is the formation of endospores. Endospores are bacterial survival structures that are highly resistant to many different types of chemical and environmental stresses and therefore enable the survival of bacteria in environments that would be lethal for these cells in their normal vegetative form. It has been proposed that endospore formation has allowed for the survival of some bacteria for hundreds of millions of years (e.g. in salt crystals) although these publications have been questioned. Endospore formation is limited to several genera of gram-positive bacteria such as Bacillus and Clostridium. It differs from reproductive spores in that only one spore is formed per cell resulting in no net gain in cell number upon endospore germination. The location of an endospore within a cell is species-specific and can be used to determine the identity of a bacterium. Dipicolinic acid is a chemical compound which composes 5% to 15% of the dry weight of bacterial spores and is implicated in being responsible for the heat resistance of endospores. Archaeologists have found viable endospores taken from the intestines of Egyptian mummies as well as from lake sediments in Northern Sweden estimated to be many thousands of years old.
