= Cell envelope =

Protective outer structure of bacterial cells

The cell envelope comprises the inner cell membrane and the cell wall of a bacterium. In gram-negative bacteria an outer membrane is also included. This envelope is not present in the Mollicutes where the cell wall is absent.

Bacterial cell envelopes fall into two major categories: a gram-positive type which stains purple during Gram staining and a gram-negative type which stains pink during Gram staining. Either type may have an enclosing capsule of polysaccharides for extra protection. As a group these are known as polysaccharide encapsulated bacteria.

== Function ==
As in other organisms, the bacterial cell wall provides structural integrity to the cell. In prokaryotes, the primary function of the cell wall is to protect the cell from internal turgor pressure caused by the much higher concentrations of proteins and other molecules inside the cell compared to its external environment. The bacterial cell wall differs from that of all other organisms by the presence of peptidoglycan (poly-N-acetylglucosamine and N-acetylmuramic acid), which is located immediately outside of the cytoplasmic membrane. Peptidoglycan is responsible for the rigidity of the bacterial cell wall and for the determination of cell shape. It is relatively porous and is not considered to be a permeability barrier for small substrates. While all bacterial cell walls (with a few exceptions e.g. intracellular parasites such as Mycoplasma) contain peptidoglycan, not all cell walls have the same overall structures. This is notably expressed through the classification into gram positive and gram negative bacteria.

== Types ==
=== The gram-positive cell wall ===
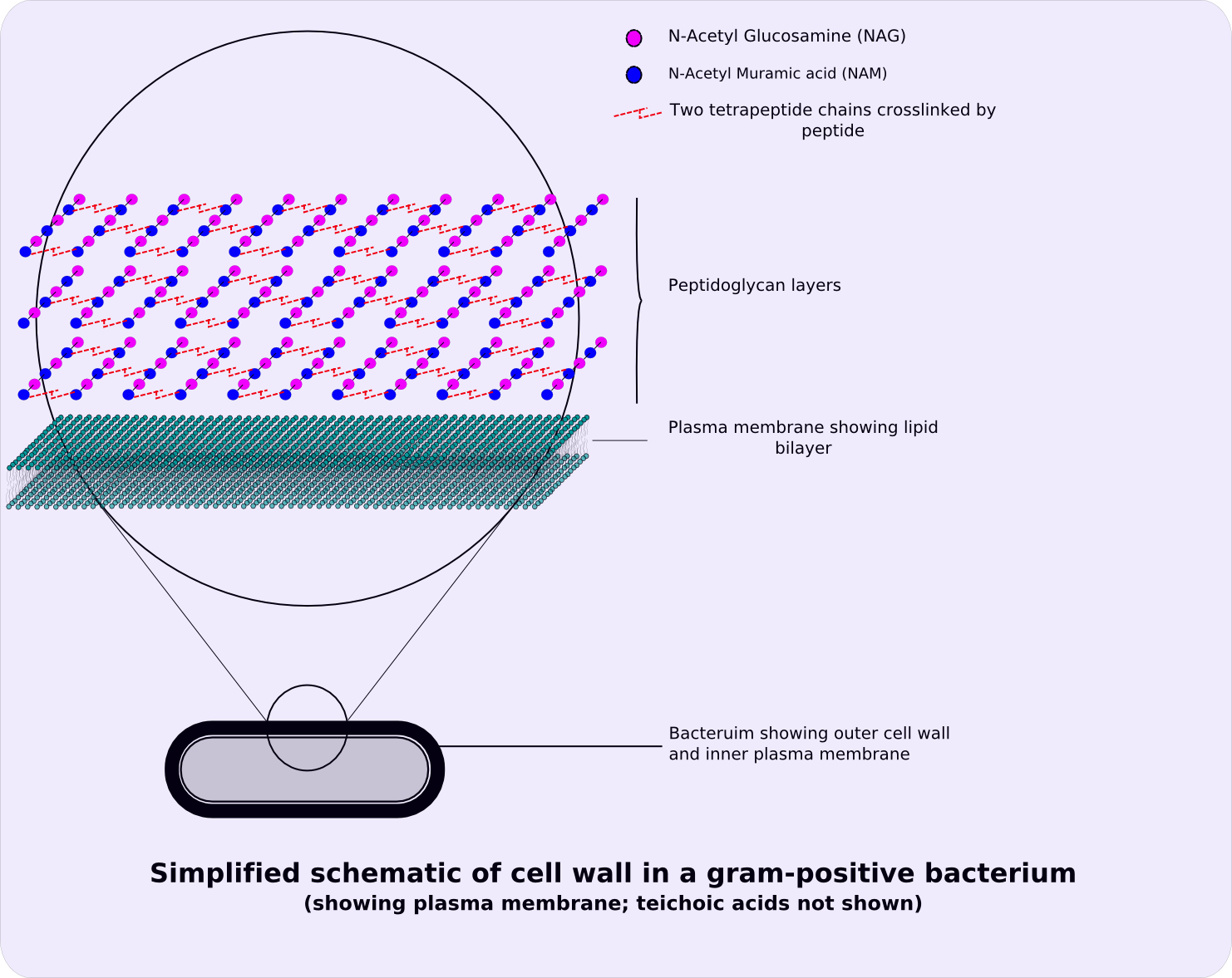
Schematic of typical gram-positive cell wall showing arrangement of N-Acetylglucosamine and N-Acetylmuramic acid; Teichoic acids not shown.

The gram-positive cell wall is characterized by the presence of a very thick peptidoglycan layer, which is responsible for the retention of the crystal violet dyes during the Gram staining procedure. It is found exclusively in organisms belonging to the Actinomycetota (or high %G+C gram-positive organisms) and the Bacillota (or low %G+C gram-positive organisms). Bacteria within the Deinococcota group may also exhibit gram-positive staining behavior but contain some cell wall structures typical of gram-negative organisms. Imbedded in the gram-positive cell wall are polyalcohols called teichoic acids, some of which are lipid-linked to form lipoteichoic acids. Because lipoteichoic acids are covalently linked to lipids within the cytoplasmic membrane they are responsible for linking the peptidoglycan to the cytoplasmic membrane. Teichoic acids give the gram-positive cell wall an overall negative charge due to the presence of phosphodiester bonds between teichoic acid monomers.

Outside the cell wall, many gram-positive bacteria have an S-layer of "tiled" proteins. The S-layer assists attachment and biofilm formation. Outside the S-layer, there is often a capsule of polysaccharides. The capsule helps the bacterium evade host phagocytosis. In laboratory culture, the S-layer and capsule are often lost by reductive evolution (the loss of a trait in absence of positive selection).

=== The gram-negative cell wall ===
Schematic of typical gram-negative cell wall showing arrangement of N-Acetylglucosamine and N-Acetylmuramic acid and the outer membrane containing lipopolysaccharide.

The gram-negative cell wall contains a thinner peptidoglycan layer adjacent to the cytoplasmic membrane than the gram-positive wall, which is responsible for the cell wall's inability to retain the crystal violet stain upon decolourisation with ethanol during Gram staining. In addition to the peptidoglycan layer the gram-negative cell wall also contains an additional outer membrane composed by phospholipids and lipopolysaccharides which face into the external environment. The highly charged nature of lipopolysaccharides confer an overall negative charge to the gram -negative cell wall. The chemical structure of the outer membrane lipopolysaccharides is often unique to specific bacterial strains (i.e. sub-species) and is responsible for many of the antigenic properties of these strains.

As a phospholipid bilayer, the lipid portion of the outer membrane is largely impermeable to all charged molecules. However, channels called porins are present in the outer membrane that allow for passive transport of many ions, sugars and amino acids across the outer membrane. These molecules are therefore present in the periplasm, the region between the plasma membrane and outer membrane. The periplasm contains the peptidoglycan layer and many proteins responsible for substrate binding or hydrolysis and reception of extracellular signals. The periplasm is thought to exist as a gel-like state rather than a liquid due to the high concentration of proteins and peptidoglycan found within it. Because of its location between the cytoplasmic and outer membranes, signals received and substrates bound are available to be transported across the cytoplasmic membrane using transport and signaling proteins imbedded there.

In nature, many uncultivated gram-negative bacteria also have an S-layer and a capsule. These structures are often lost during laboratory cultivation.

=== Mycobacteria ===
The Mycobacteria (acid-fast bacteria) have a cell envelope which is not typical of gram-positives or gram-negatives. The mycobacterial cell envelope does not consist of the outer membrane characteristic of gram-negatives, but has a significant peptidoglycan-arabinogalactan-mycolic acid wall structure which provides an external permeability barrier. Therefore, there is thought to be a distinct 'pseudoperiplasm' compartment between the cytoplasmic membrane and this outer barrier. The nature of this compartment is not well understood. Acid-fast bacteria, like Mycobacteria, are resistant to decolorization by acids during staining procedures. The high mycolic acid content of Mycobacteria, is responsible for the staining pattern of poor absorption followed by high retention. The most common staining technique used to identify acid-fast bacteria is the Ziehl–Neelsen stain or acid-fast stain, in which the acid fast bacilli are stained bright red and stand out clearly against a blue background.

=== Bacteria lacking a peptidoglycan cell wall ===
The obligate intracellular bacteria in the family Chlamydiaceae are unique in their morphology as they do not contain detectable amounts of peptidoglycan in the cell wall of their infectious forms. Instead, the extracellular forms of these gram-negative bacteria maintain their structural integrity by relying on a layer of disulfide bond cross-linked cysteine-rich proteins, which is located between cytoplasmic membrane and outer membrane in a manner analogous to the peptidoglycan layer in other gram-negative bacteria. In the intracellular forms of the bacterium the disulfide cross linkage is not found, which confers this form more mechanically fragile.

The cell envelopes of the bacterial class of mollicutes do not have a cell wall. The main pathogenic bacteria in this class are mycoplasma and ureaplasma.

L-form bacteria are strains bacteria that lack cell walls derived from bacteria that normally possess cell walls.

== See also ==
- Viral envelope
