= Staphylococcus haemolyticus =

Scientific classification
- Domain: Bacteria
- Kingdom: Bacillati
- Phylum: Bacillota
- Class: Bacilli
- Order: Bacillales
- Family: Staphylococcaceae
- Genus: Staphylococcus
- Species: S. haemolyticus

Binomial name
- Staphylococcus haemolyticus Schleifer & Kloos, 1975

Species of bacterium

Staphylococcus haemolyticus is a member of the coagulase-negative staphylococci (CoNS). It is part of the skin flora of humans, and its largest populations are usually found at the axillae, perineum, and inguinal areas. S. haemolyticus also colonizes primates and domestic animals. It is a well-known opportunistic pathogen, and is the second-most frequently isolated CoNS (S. epidermidis is the first). Infections can be localized or systemic, and are often associated with the insertion of medical devices. The highly antibiotic-resistant phenotype and ability to form biofilms make S. haemolyticus a difficult pathogen to treat. Its most closely related species is Staphylococcus borealis.

== Biology and biochemistry ==
S. haemolyticus is nonmotile, nonsporulating, facultatively anaerobic, and Gram-positive. Cells are typically coccus-shaped and range from 0.8 to 1.3 μm in diameter. It lives on a wide variety of substrates, including glucose, glycerol, maltose, sucrose, and trehalose. It also tests positive for acetoin production, arginine, dihydrolase, benzidine, catalase, hemolysis, and lipase; it tests negative for coagulase, DNase, ornithine decarboxylase and phosphatase

=== Growth conditions ===
Optimal growth occurs between 30 and 40 °C in the presence of oxygen and 10% NaCl. However, some strains can grow at temperatures that range between 18 and 45 °C. Growth at 15 °C or 15% NaCl is poor or absent.

=== Genome structure ===
The S. haemolyticus strain JCSC1435 genome contains a 2,685,015 bp chromosome and three plasmids of 2,300 bp, 2,366 bp, and 8,180 bp. The chromosome is comparable in size to those of S. aureus and S. epidermidis and contains a similar G+C content. In addition, a large proportion of the open reading frames (ORFs) are conserved across all three species. On average, orthologous ORFs are 78% identical. However, S. haemolyticus does have unique chromosome regions distributed near oriC (the origin of chromosomal DNA replication), and these regions are collectively referred to as the “oriC environ”.

As noted, some S. haemolyticus ORFs differ from S. aureus and S. epidermidis. Some of these ORFs encode gene products with known biological features, such as the regulation of RNA synthesis, the transport of ribose and ribitol, and the essential components of nucleic acid and cell wall teichoic acid biosynthesis. Other unique ORFs likely encode products involved with bacterial pathogenesis and at least three of these ORFs show homology to staphylococcal hemolysins.

The S. haemolyticus genome also contains many insertion sequences (ISs). These IS elements may promote frequent genomic rearrangements which accelerate the diversification of the species. Theoretically, these adaptations might help S. haemolyticus overcome the adverse effects of chemical exposure (i.e. the use of antibiotics). The table below contains a list of genes known to be associated with S. haemolyticus antibiotic resistance.

Class	Antimicrobial Agent	MIC (mg/L)	ORF ID	Gene Name	Product	Location
Penicillins	Oxacillin	>512	SH0091	mecA	Penicillin-binding protein 2'	ΨSCCmec(h1435)
	Ampicillin	64	SH1764	blaZ	β-Lactamase	Tn552
	methicillin			mecA	Penicillin-binding protein 2'	ΨSCCmec(h1435)
Cephalosporins	Ceftizoxime	>512	SH0091	mecA	Penicillin-binding protein 2'	ΨSCCmec(h1435)
Macrolides	Erythromycin	>512	pSHaeB1	ermC	rRNA adenine N-6-methyltransferase	Plasmid pSHaeB
			SH2305	msrSA	ATP-dependent efflux system	πSh1
			SH2306	mphBM	Macrolide 2'-phosphotransferase	πSh1
quinolones	Ofloxacin	8	SH0006	gyrA	DNA gyrase (topoisomerase II) subunit A (point mutation C7313T)	
			SH1553	parC (grlA)	Topoisomerase IV subunit A (point mutation G1598138A)	
Tetracyclines	Tetracycline	2				
	Minocycline	0.5				
Aminoglycosides	Kanamycin	>512	SH1611	aacA-aphD	Bifunctional aminoglycoside N-acetyltransferase and aminoglycoside phosphotransferase	Tn4001
	Tobramycin	16	SH1611	aacA-aphD	Bifunctional	Tn4001
	Gentamicin	64	SH1611	aacA-aphD	Bifunctional	Tn4001
Glycopeptides	Vancomycin	4				
	Teicoplanin	64				
Fosfomycin	Fosfomycin	>512	pSHaeA1	fosB	Glutathione transferase	Plasmid pSHaeA

=== Cell wall ===
Like other Gram-positive microbes, S. haemolyticus has a thick, rather homogenous, cell wall (60-80 nm) composed of peptidoglycan, teichoic acid, and protein. Peptidoglycan of group A3 (with L-lysine as the diamino acid in position 3 of the peptide subunit and a glycine-rich interpeptide bridge) is a characteristic feature of this microbe, and the two predominant cross-bridges are COOH-Gly-Gly-Ser-Gly-Gly-NH_{2} and COOH-Ala-Gly-Ser-Gly-Gly-NH_{2}. Alterations of these cross-bridges are implicated in glycopeptide resistance. S. haemolyticus teichoic acids are water-soluble polymers with repeating phosphodiester groups covalently linked to peptidoglycan. Peptidoglycan type L-Lys-Gly 3.5-4.0, L-Ser0.9-1.5 Teichoic acid contains both glycerol and N-acetylglucosamine. The major cell wall fatty acids are CBr-15, CBr-17, C18, and C20.

=== Capsule ===
Certain strains of S. haemolyticus are capable of producing a capsular polysaccharide (CP). S. haemolyticus strain JCSC1435 contains a capsule operon located within the “oriC environ”. This operon contains 13 ORFs in a 14,652-bp region and is referred to as the cap_{sh} locus. The first seven genes of cap_{sh} (capA_{sh} through capG_{sh}) are homologous to the S. aureus cap5 or cap8 locus. However, capH through capM are unique to S. haemolyticus, and this region encodes enzymes for a unique trideoxy sugar residue that is N-acylated by aspartic acid.

CP production is influenced by culture medium and growth phase. Cultivation in tryptic soy broth (TSB)], TSB with 1% glucose, brain heart infusion broth, or Columbia broth with 2% NaCl favors the production of CP; cultivation on Columbia salt agar plates is suboptimal. Only trace amounts of CP are generated before the end of exponential phase, and the maximal rate of CP production does not occur until early stationary phase.

CP is considered a virulence factor because it provides resistance against complement-mediated polymorphonuclear neutrophil phagocytosis.

=== Biofilm formation ===
The ability to adhere to medical devices and subsequently form biofilms is a major virulence factor associated with S. haemolyticus. Biofilm formation increases antibiotic resistance and often leads to persistent infections. S. haemolyticus biofilms are not polysaccharide intercellular adhesin (PIA) dependent, and the lack of the ica operon (the gene cluster that encodes the production of PIA) can be used to distinguish S. haemolyticus isolates from other CoNS species.

Biofilm formation is influenced by a variety of factors including carbohydrates, proteins, and extracellular DNA. Detachment assays with NaIO_{4}, proteinase K, or DNase result in 38%, 98%, and 100% detachment, respectively. The high level of detachment associated with DNase treatment has led several authors to suggest a cell-to-surface and/or cell-to-cell adhesion function for extracellular DNA. Biofilm formation also appears to be influenced by the presence of glucose and NaCl. Biofilm formation is enhanced when cultivated in TSB with 1% glucose and decreased when cultivated in TSB with 3% NaCl. The production of a capsular polysaccharide decreases biofilm formation.

Subinhibitory concentrations (subminimum inhibitory concentrations) of the antibiotic dicloxacillin also affect the growth of S. haemolyticus biofilms. Biofilms formed in the presence of subinhibitory concentrations of dicloxacillin contain less biomass and have an altered composition. They are thinner, cover less surface area, and are less hydrophobic, but they also have an increased level of resistance to dicloxacillin.

=== Toxins ===
Some S. haemolyticus strains produce enterotoxins (SE) and/or hemolysins. In a study of 64 S. haemolyticus strains, production of SEA, SEB, SEC, and/or SEE was noted (only SED was absent). In addition, 31.3% of the strains were found to produce at least one type of enterotoxin.

== Identification ==
S. haemolyticus can be identified on the species level using a variety of manual and automated methods. The most frequently employed are: the reference method (based on growth tests), API ID 32 Staph (bioMe´rieux), Staph-Zym (Rosco), UZA (a rapid 4-h method), and polymerase chain reaction and electrophoretic analysis of the 16S rRNA, hsp60, or sodA gene sequence. Preference towards a particular method usually depends on convenience, economics, and required specificity (some species have identical 16S rRNA). The most closely related species of S. haemolyticus is Staphylococcus borealis.

Method	Tests performed	Interpretation
Reference	16 conventional growth tests including: colony pigment, DNase, alkaline phosphatase, ornithine decarboxylase, urease, acetoin production, novobiocin sensitive, polymyxin resistance, and acid production from D-trehalose, D-mannitol, D-mannose, D-turanose, D-xylose, D-cellobiose, maltose, and sucrose	Results are compared to the literature on staphylococcal species
API ID 32 Staph (bioMe´rieux)	A bacterial suspension is added to a set of wells containing dried substrates for 26 colorimetric tests.	After 24 hours of incubation at 37 °C, and the addition of a few other reagents, the results are determined by an automated computer using APILAB ID 32 software
Staph-Zym (Rosco)	A bacterial suspension is added to minitubes for 10 metabolic or enzymatic tests	The results are determined by color changes, after 24 hours of incubation, and tests for polymyxin and novobiocin susceptibility
UZA (a rapid 4-hour method)	This method is a two-step process. Step one consists of three tests measured after four hours incubation at 37 °C: acid production from D-trehalose, urease, and alkaline phosphatase. Step two includes four possible tests, which are administered as needed after 24 hours of incubation at 37 °C. They are: ornithine decarboxylase, novobiocin susceptibility, fosfomycin susceptibility, and anaerobic growth	Results are compared to the literature on staphylococcal species
PCR and electrophoresis	Uses gene specific degenerate primers to amplify pieces of DNA, these fragments are resolved using electrophoresis, and then purified for DNA sequencing	Results are determined by a sequence analysis

== Clinical importance ==
S. haemolyticus is the second-most clinically isolated CoNS (S. epidermidis is the first) and it is considered an important nosocomial pathogen. Human infections include: native valve endocarditis, sepsis, peritonitis, and urinary tract, wound, bone, and joint infections. Infrequent soft-tissue infections usually occur in immunocompromised patients. Like other CoNS, S. haemolyticus is often associated with the insertion of foreign bodies, such as prosthetic valves, cerebrospinal fluid shunts, orthopedic prostheses, and intravascular, urinary, and dialysis catheters. S. haemolyticus is multi-drug resistant and able to form biofilms, which makes infections especially difficult to treat.

=== Vascular catheter-associated infections ===
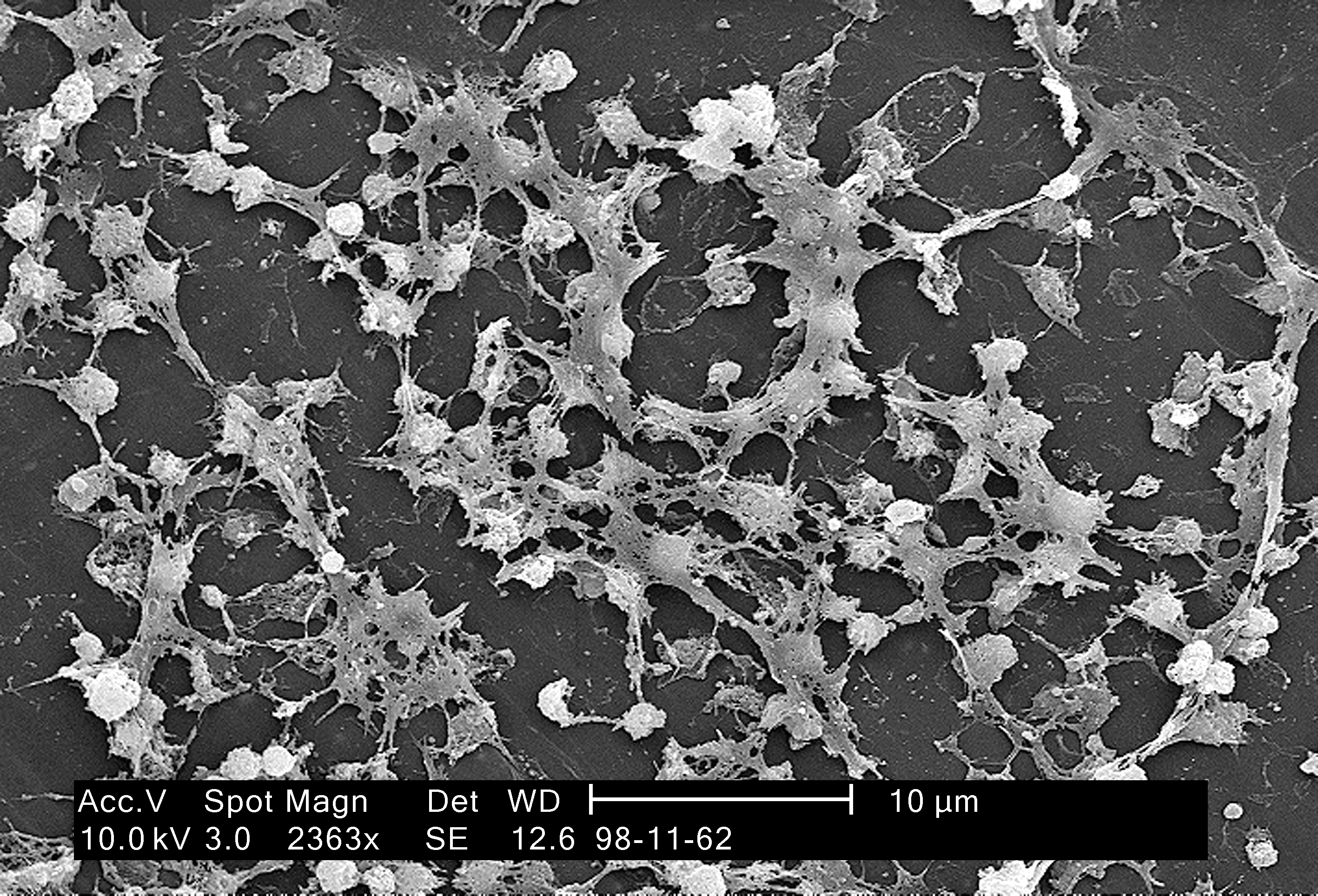
Staphylococcus on a catheter

S. haemolyticus can colonize central venous catheters and cause serious medical complications. Colonization occurs when S. haemolyticus migrates from the skin, along the external surface of the device, or from the hub, due to manipulation by health care workers. In either scenario, a high probability exists that the microbe will form a biofilm. These infections can remain localized or become systemic (i.e. bacteremia). The severity of infection varies depending on the type of catheter, frequency of manipulation, and virulence factors of the S. haemolyticus strain. Removal of the catheter is usually considered to be the best treatment, but this is not always possible. Alternatively, vancomycin or teicoplanin may be administered. Recent evidence suggests that glycopeptides can be supplemented with β-lactams to work synergistically.

=== Antibiotic resistance ===
S. haemolyticus has the highest level of antibiotic resistance among the CoNS. Various strains are resistant to one or more of these antibiotics: penicillins, cephalosporins, macrolides, quinolones, tetracyclines, aminoglycosides, glycopeptides, and fosfomycin (see table in Genome structure), and multidrug resistance is common. As indicated above, even glycopeptide-resistant (vancomycin and teicoplanin) strains have begun to emerge.
