= Tarocin =

Class of chemical compounds

Tarocin A

Names
- IUPAC name (4S,5R)-5-[3,5-bis(trifluoromethyl)phenyl]-4-methyl-3-(2-naphthalen-1-ylacetyl)-1,3-oxazolidin-2-one

Identifiers
ChEBI	CHEBI:131612
ChEMBL	ChEMBL4066320
ChemSpider	58163459
PubChem CID	118797938
- InChI: InChI=1S/C24H17F6NO3/c1-13-21(16-9-17(23(25,26)27)12-18(10-16)24(28,29)30)34-22(33)31(13)20(32)11-15-7-4-6-14-5-2-3-8-19(14)15/h2-10,12-13,21H,11H2,1H3/t13-,21-/m0/s1 Key: GBVCJLDLMGPDCL-ZSEKCTLFSA-N
- SMILES: CC1C(OC(=O)N1C(=O)CC2=CC=CC3=CC=CC=C32)C4=CC(=CC(=C4)C(F)(F)F)C(F)(F)F

Properties
Chemical formula	C_{24}H_{17}F_{6}NO_{3}
Molar mass	481.394 g·mol^{−1}
- Except where otherwise noted, data are given for materials in their standard state (at 25 °C [77 °F], 100 kPa). Infobox references

Tarocin B

Names
- IUPAC name 3-(2-cyclohexylbenzimidazol-1-yl)-N-[(1R,2R,4R)-1,7,7-trimethyl-2-bicyclo[2.2.1]heptanyl]propanamide

Identifiers
ChEBI	CHEBI:131613
ChEMBL	ChEMBL4570512
ChemSpider	58163460
PubChem CID	118797939
- InChI: InChI=1S/C26H37N3O/c1-25(2)19-13-15-26(25,3)22(17-19)28-23(30)14-16-29-21-12-8-7-11-20(21)27-24(29)18-9-5-4-6-10-18/h7-8,11-12,18-19,22H,4-6,9-10,13-17H2,1-3H3,(H,28,30)/t19-,22-,26+/m1/s1 Key: SLSHAQAUYNMJCT-SNOBZRMMSA-N
- SMILES: CC1(C2CCC1(C(C2)NC(=O)CCN3C4=CC=CC=C4N=C3C5CCCCC5)C)C

Properties
Chemical formula	C_{26}H_{37}N_{3}O
Molar mass	407.602 g·mol^{−1}
- Except where otherwise noted, data are given for materials in their standard state (at 25 °C [77 °F], 100 kPa). Infobox references

Tarocin A and tarocin B are two structurally unrelated compounds that inhibit the TarO enzyme involved in teichoic acid biosynthesis in bacteria.

Using either of them with β-lactam antibiotics seems to be effective in mice against some β-lactam-resistant bacteria.

Because the tarocins lack activity when used alone it may simplify the clinical trials for approval for medical use.
