= Streptomyces zinciresistens =

Scientific classification
- Domain: Bacteria
- Kingdom: Bacillati
- Phylum: Actinomycetota
- Class: Actinomycetia
- Order: Streptomycetales
- Family: Streptomycetaceae
- Genus: Streptomyces
- Species: S. zinciresistens

Binomial name
- Streptomyces zinciresistens Lin et al. 2011

Type strain
- ACCC 41871, HAMBI 3107, JCM 18080, CCNWNQ 0016, K42

Species of bacterium

Streptomyces zinciresistens is a filamentous bacterium species from the genus of Streptomyces which has been isolated from a copper and zinc mine in the Shaanxi province in China. Streptomyces zinciresistens is resistant against zinc.

== See also ==
- List of Streptomyces species
