= CDP-glycerol diphosphatase =

Class of enzymes

Identifiers
- EC no.: 3.6.1.16
- CAS no.: 37289-28-4

Databases
- BRENDA: enzyme data
- ExPASy: NiceZyme view
- KEGG: enzyme entry
- MetaCyc: metabolic pathway
- Rhea: reactions
- PDB structures: RCSB PDB PDBe PDBsum
- Gene Ontology: AmiGO / QuickGO
Search
- PMC: articles
- PubMed: articles
- NCBI: proteins

CDP-glycerol diphosphatase (EC 3.6.1.16) is an enzyme characterised from Bacillus subtilis that catalyzes the hydrolysis of cytidine diphosphate glycerol (CDP-glycerol) to cytidine monophosphate and glyceryl 3-phosphate:

CDP-glycerol
H_{2}O
P_{i}
cytidine monophosphate
+
glycerol 3-phosphate

The enzyme removes excess CDP-glycerol when the bacterium is producing teichoic acids only slowly.

This enzyme is a hydrolase, specifically one acting on acid anhydrides in phosphorus-containing anhydrides. The systematic name of this enzyme class is CDP-glycerol phosphoglycerohydrolase. Other names in use include CDP-glycerol pyrophosphatase, and cytidine diphosphoglycerol pyrophosphatase.
