= Streptomyces erringtonii =

Scientific classification
- Domain: Bacteria
- Kingdom: Bacillati
- Phylum: Actinomycetota
- Class: Actinomycetia
- Order: Streptomycetales
- Family: Streptomycetaceae
- Genus: Streptomyces
- Species: S. erringtonii

Binomial name
- Streptomyces erringtonii Santhanam et al. 2013

Type strain
- CGMCC 4.7016, I36, KACC 15424

Species of bacterium

Streptomyces erringtonii is a filamentous bacterium species from the genus of Streptomyces which has been isolated from hay meadow soil from the Cockle Park Experimental Farm in Northumberland in the United Kingdom.

== See also ==
- List of Streptomyces species
