= C5H12O5 =

The molecular formula C_{5}H_{12}O_{5} (molar mass: 152.14 g/mol, exact mass: 152.0685 u) may refer to:

- Arabitol or arabinitol
- Ribitol, or adonitol
- Xylitol
