= N-acetylglucosaminyldiphosphoundecaprenol N-acetyl-beta-D-mannosaminyltransferase =

Class of enzymes

Identifiers
- EC no.: 2.4.1.187
- CAS no.: 118731-82-1

Databases
- IntEnz: IntEnz view
- BRENDA: BRENDA entry
- ExPASy: NiceZyme view
- KEGG: KEGG entry
- MetaCyc: metabolic pathway
- PRIAM: profile
- PDB structures: RCSB PDB PDBe PDBsum
Search
- PMC: articles
- PubMed: articles
- NCBI: proteins

N-acetylglucosaminyldiphosphoundecaprenol N-acetyl-beta-D-mannosaminyltransferase (EC 2.4.1.187, uridine diphosphoacetyl-mannosamineacetylglucosaminylpyrophosphorylundecaprenol acetylmannosaminyltransferase, N-acetylmannosaminyltransferase, UDP-N-acetylmannosamine:N-acetylglucosaminyl diphosphorylundecaprenol N-acetylmannosaminyltransferase, UDP-N-acetyl-D-mannosamine:N-acetyl-beta-D-glucosaminyldiphosphoundecaprenol beta-1,4-N-acetylmannosaminyltransferase) is an enzyme with systematic name UDP-N-acetyl-D-mannosamine:N-acetyl-beta-D-glucosaminyldiphosphoundecaprenol 4-beta-N-acetylmannosaminyltransferase. This enzyme catalyses the following chemical reaction

UDP-N-acetyl-D-mannosamine + N-acetyl-D-glucosaminyldiphosphoundecaprenol $\rightleftharpoons$ UDP + N-acetyl-beta-D-mannosaminyl-(1->4)-N-acetyl-D-glucosaminyldiphosphoundecaprenol

This enzyme is involved in the biosynthesis of teichoic acid linkage units in bacterial cell walls.
