= Bacterial morphological plasticity =

Type of physical variation in bacteria

Bacterial morphological plasticity refers to changes in the shape and size that bacterial cells undergo when they encounter stressful environments. Although bacteria have evolved complex molecular strategies to maintain their shape, many are able to alter their shape as a survival strategy in response to protist predators, antibiotics, the immune response, and other threats.

== Bacterial shape and size under selective forces ==
Normally, bacteria have different shapes and sizes which include coccus, rod and helical/spiral (among others less common) and that allow for their classification. For instance, rod shapes may allow bacteria to attach more readily in environments with shear stress (e.g., in flowing water). Cocci may have access to small pores, creating more attachment sites per cell and hiding themselves from external shear forces. Spiral bacteria combine some of the characteristics cocci (small footprints) and of filaments (more surface area on which shear forces can act) and the ability to form an unbroken set of cells to build biofilms. Several bacteria alter their morphology in response to the types and concentrations of external compounds. Bacterial morphology changes help to optimize interactions with cells and the surfaces to which they attach. This mechanism has been described in bacteria such as Escherichia coli and Helicobacter pylori.

Bacterial shape	Example	Changes under selective forces
Filamentation Filamentation allows bacteria to have more surface area for long-term attachments and can interlink themselves with porous surfaces.	Caulobacter crescentus: in their niche (freshwater), filament is the regular shape that contributes to their resistance to heat and survival.	Regular rod morphology of Escherichia coli versus SOS stress-induced filaments observed in the urinary tract infection model.; Extended filamentous structures in Helicobacter pylori, which under normal conditions is a spiral-shaped bacteria.
Prosthecate Prosthecate bacteria are more easily attached by placing adhesins on the tips of thin appendages or may insinuate these into pores or crevices in solid substrates.	Prosthecomicrobium pneumaticum	Ancalomicrobium adetum: Under high nutrients concentrations: road or spherical shape.; Low nutrients: it prosthecaes to increase surface area for nutrients transport Ancalomicrobium adetum with seven prosthecae
Bifid Y-shaped cell occurs most often in Gram positive, but also in Gram-negative bacteria. It is part of the normal cycle of several microorganisms, but could be induced by specific cues.	Bifidobacterium longum	Most of Bradyrhizobium japonicum cells swell and branch (changing to a Y shape) in culture by the addition of succinate or fumarate because these strains lack succinate dehydrogenase and do not progress through the cycle.; Lactobacillus bifidus produces bifids and branched cells in the presence of cations or sodium salts.
Pleomorphic Pleomorphic bacteria grow adopting different forms under explicit genetic control and are associated with important physiological phenotypes (for example due to nutrient limitation).	Legionella pneumophila This bacteria have 3 shapes in vitro and 5 in vivo, including rods, cocci, filaments, and a form created by "fragmented" cell septation.	Campylobacter jejuni adopt different forms (commas, spirals, S shapes, dimpled cells and doughnut shapes), however there is a debate whether these forms are transitional or due to environmental stress.
Helical/spiral	Leptospira spp	Helical curvature in Escherichia coli artificially imposed by growing the cells in preformed cavities.

== Bacterial filamentation ==
=== Physiological mechanisms ===
Oxidative stress, nutrient limitation, DNA damage and antibiotic exposure are examples of stressors that cause bacteria to halt septum formation and cell division. Filamentous bacteria have been considered to be over-stressed, sick and dying members of the population. However, the filamentous members of some communities have vital roles in the population's continued existence, since the filamentous phenotype can confer protection against lethal environments. Filamentous bacteria can be over 90 μm in length and play an important role in the pathogenesis of human cystitis. Filamentous forms arise via several different mechanisms.

Base Excision Repair (BER) mechanism
This is a strategy to repair DNA damage observed in E. coli. This involves two types of enzymes:
- Bifunctional glycosylases: the endonuclease III (encoded by nth gene)
- Apurinic/Apirimidinic (AP)-endonucleases: endonuclease IV (encoded by nfo gene) and exonuclease III (encoded by xth gene).
Under this mechanism, daughter cells are protected from receiving damaged copies of the bacterial chromosome, and at the same time promoting bacterial survival. A mutant for these genes lack BER activity and a strong formation of filamentous structures is observed.
SulA/FtsZ mediated filamentation
This is a mechanism to halt cell division and repair DNA. In the presence of single-stranded DNA regions, due to the action of different external cues (that induce mutations), the major bacterial recombinase (RecA) binds to this DNA regions and is activated by the presence of free nucleotide triphosphates. This activated RecA stimulates the autoproteolysis of the SOS transcriptional repressor LexA. The LexA regulon includes a cell division inhibitor, SulA, that prevent the transmission of mutant DNA to the daughter cells. SulA is a dimer that binds FtsZ (a tubulin-like GTPase) in a 1:1 ratio and acts specifically on its polymerization which results in the formation of non-septated bacteria filaments. A similar mechanism may occur in Mycobacterium tuberculosis, which also elongates after being phagocytized.
M. tuberculosis
Septum site determining protein (Ssd) encoded by rv3660c promotes filamentation in response to the stressful intracellular environment. SSD inhibits septum and is also found in Mycobacterium smegmatis. The bacterial filament ultrastructure is consistent with inhibition of FtsZ polymerization (previously described). Ssd is believed to be part of a global regulatory mechanism in this bacteria that promotes a shift into an altered metabolic state.
Helicobacter pylori
In this spiral-shaped Gram-negative bacterium, the filamentation mechanism are regulated by two mechanisms: the peptidases that cause peptidoglycan relaxation and the coiled-coil-rich proteins (Ccrp) that are responsible for the helical cell shape in vitro as well as in vivo. A rod shape could have probably an advantage for motility than the regular helical shape. In this model, there is another protein Mre, which is not exactly involved in the maintenance of cell shape but in the cell cycle. It has been demotrated that mutant cells were highly elongated due to a delay in cell division and contained non-segregated chromosomes.

== Environmental cues ==
=== Immune response ===
Some of the strategies for bacteria to bypass host defenses include the generation of filamentous structures. As it has been observed in other organisms (such as fungi), filamentous forms are resistant to phagocytosis. As an example of this, during urinary tract infection, filamentous structures of uropathogenic E. coli (UPEC) start to develop in response to host innate immune response (more exactly in response to Toll-like receptor 4-TLR4). TLR-4 is stimulated by the lipopolysaccharide (LPS) and recruits neutrophils (PMN) which are important leukocytes to eliminate these bacteria. Adopting filamentous structures, bacteria resist these phagocytic cells and their neutralizing activity (which include antimicrobial peptides, degradative enzyme and reactive oxygen species). It is believed that filamentation is induced as a response of DNA damage (by the mechanisms previously exposed), participating SulA mechanism and additional factors. Furthermore, the length of the filamentous bacteria could have a stronger attachment to the epithelial cells, with an increased number of adhesins participating in the interaction, making even harder the work for (PMN). The interaction between phagocyte cells and adopting filamentous-shape bacteria provide an advantage to their survival. In this relate, filamentation could be not only a virulence, but also a resistance factor in these bacteria.

=== Predator protist ===
Bacteria exhibit a high degree of "morphological plasticity" that protects them from predation. Bacterial capture by protozoa is affected by size and irregularities in shape of bacteria. Oversized, filamentous, or prosthecate bacteria may be too large to be ingested. On the other hand, other factors such as extremely tiny cells, high-speed motility, tenacious attachment to surfaces, formation of biofilms and multicellular conglomerates may also reduce predation. Several phenotypic features of bacteria are adapted to escape protistan-grazing pressure.

Protistan grazing or bacterivory is a protozoan feeding on bacteria. It affects prokaryotic size and the distribution of microbial groups. There are several feeding mechanisms used to seek and capture prey, because the bacteria have to avoid being consumed from these factors. There are six feeding mechanisms listed by Kevin D. Young.

- Filter feeding: transport water through a filter or sieve
- Sedimentation: allows prey to settle into a capture device
- Interception: capture by predator-induced current or motility and phagocytosis
- Raptorial: predator craws and ingests prey through pharynx or by pseudopods
- Pallium: prey engulfed e.g. by extrusion of feeding membrane
- Myzocytosis: punctures prey and suck out cytoplasm and content

Bacterial responses are elicited depending on the predator and prey combinations because feeding mechanisms differ among the protists. Moreover, the grazing protists also produce the by-products, which directly lead to the morphological plasticity of prey bacteria. For example, the morphological phenotypes of Flectobacillus spp. were evaluated in the presence and absence of the flagellate grazer Orchromonas spp. in a laboratory that has environmental control within a chemostat. Without grazer and with adequate nutrient supply, the Flectobacillus spp. grew mainly in medium-sized rod (4-7 μm), remaining a typical 6.2 μm in length. With the predator, the Flectobacillus spp. size was altered to an average 18.6 μm and it is resistant to grazing. If the bacteria are exposed to the soluble by-products produced by grazing Orchromonas spp. and pass through a dialysis membrane, the bacterial length can increase to an average 11.4 μm. Filamentation occurs as a direct response to these effectors that are produced by the predator and there is a size preference for grazing that varies for each species of protist. The filamentous bacteria that are larger than 7 μm in length are generally inedible by marine protists. This morphological class is called grazing resistant. Thus, filamentation leads to the prevention of phagocytosis and killing by predator.

=== Bimodal effect ===
Bimodal effect is a situation that bacterial cell in an intermediate size range are consumed more rapidly than the very large or the very small. The bacteria, which are smaller than 0.5 μm in diameter, are grazed by protists four to six times less than larger cells. Moreover, the filamentous cells or cells with diameters greater than 3 μm are often too large to ingest by protists or are grazed at substantially lower rates than smaller bacteria. The specific effects vary with the size ratio between predator and prey. Pernthaler et al. classified susceptible bacteria into four groups by rough size.

- Bacterial size < 0.4 μm were not grazed well
- Bacterial size between 0.4 μm and 1.6 μm were "grazing vulnerable"
- Bacterial size between 1.6 μm and 2.4 μm were "grazing suppressed"
- Bacterial size > 2.4 μm were "grazing resistant"

Filamentous preys are resistant to protist predation in a number of marine environments. In fact, there is no bacterium entirely safe. Some predators graze the larger filaments to some degree. Morphological plasticity of some bacterial strains is able to show at different growth conditions. For instance, at enhanced growth rates, some strains can form large thread-like morphotypes. While filament formation in subpopulations can occur during starvation or at suboptimal growth conditions. These morphological shifts could be triggered by external chemical cues that might be released by the predator itself.

Besides bacterial size, there are several factors affecting the predation of protists. Bacterial shape, the spiral morphology may play a defensive role towards predation feedings. For example, Arthrospira may reduce its susceptibility to predation by altering its spiral pitch. This alteration inhibits some natural geometric feature of the protist's ingestion apparatus. Multicellular complexes of bacterial cells also change the ability of protist's ingestion. Cells in biofilms or microcolonies are often more resistant to predation. For instance, the swarm cells of Serratia liquefaciens resist predation by its predator, Tetrahymenu. Due to the normal-sized cells that first contact a surface are most susceptible, bacteria need elongating swarm cells to protect them from predation until the biofilm matures. For aquatic bacteria, they can produce a wide range of extracellular polymeric substances (EPS), which comprise protein, nucleic acids, lipids, polysaccharides and other biological macromolecules. EPS secretion protects bacteria from HNF grazing. The EPS-producing planktonic bacteria typically develop subpopulations of single cells and microcolonies that are embedded in an EPS matrix. The larger microcolonies are also protected from flagellate predation because of their size. The shift to the colonial type may be a passive consequence of selective feeding on single cells. However, the microcolony formation can be specifically induced in the presence of predators by cell-cell communication (quorum sensing).

As for bacterial motility, the bacteria with high-speed motility sometimes avoid grazing better than their nonmotile or slower strains especially the smallest, fastest bacteria. Moreover, a cell's movement strategy may be altered by predation. The bacteria move by run-and-reverse strategy, which help them to beat a hasty retreat before being trapped instead of moving by the run-and-tumble strategy. However, there is a study showed that the probability of random contacts between predators and prey increases with bacterial swimming, and motile bacteria can be consumed at higher rates by HNFs. In addition, bacterial surface properties affect predation as well as other factors. For example, there is an evidence shows that protists prefer gram-negative bacteria than gram-positive bacteria. Protists consume gram-positive cells at much lower rates than consuming gram-negative cells. The heterotrophic nanoflagellates actively avoid grazing on gram-positive actinobacteria as well. Grazing on gram-positive cells takes longer digestion time than on gram-negative cells. As a result of this, the predator cannot handle more prey until the previous ingested material is consumed or expelled. Moreover, bacterial cell surface charge and hydrophobicity have also been suggested that might reduce grazing ability. Another strategy that bacteria can use for avoiding the predation is to poison their predator. For example, certain bacteria such as Chromobacterium violaceum and Pseudomonas aeruginosa can secrete toxin agents related to quorum sensing to kill their predators.

== Antibiotics ==
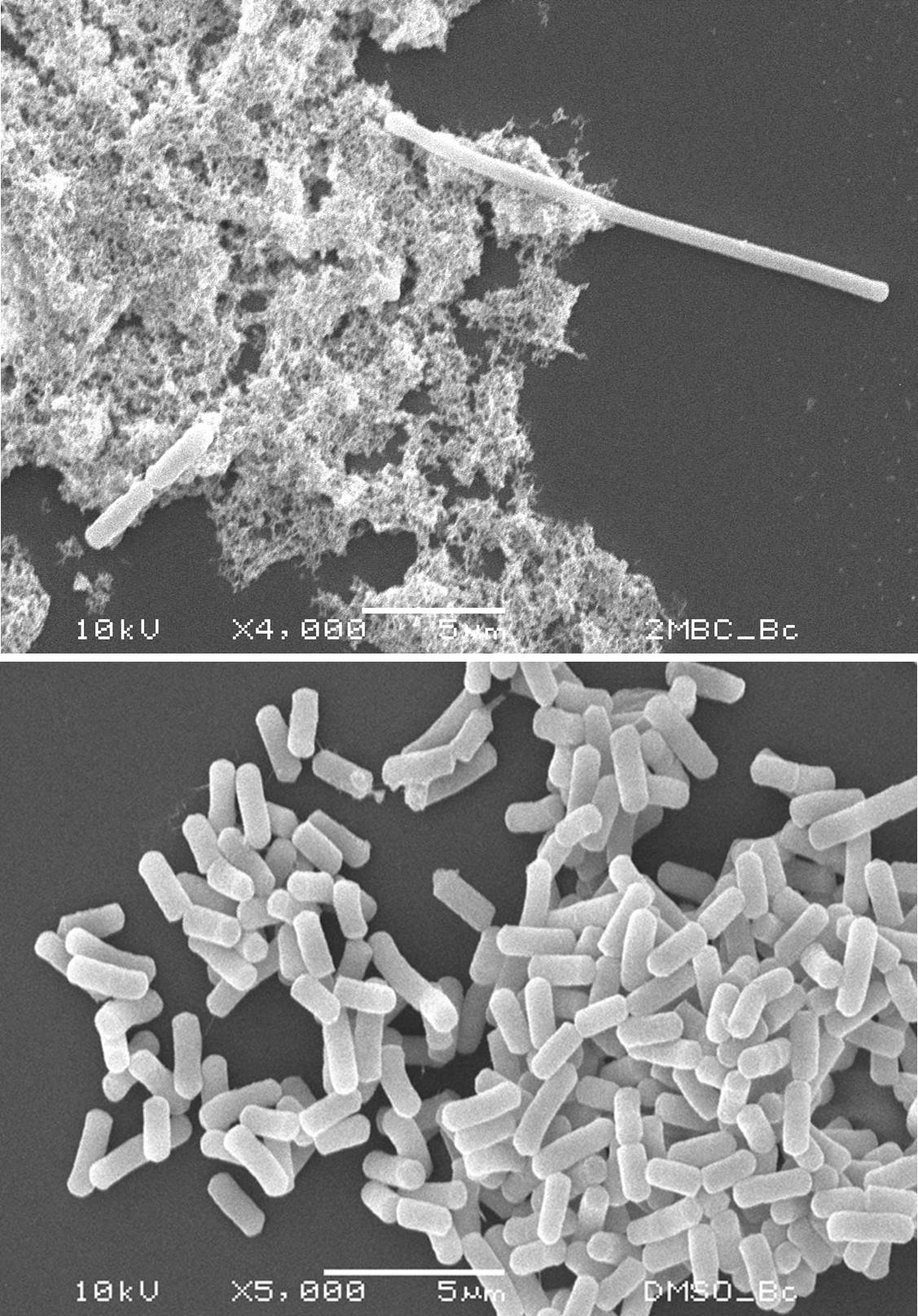
A Bacillus cereus cell that has undergone filamentation following antibacterial treatment (upper electron micrograph; top right) and regularly sized cells of untreated B. cereus (lower electron micrograph)

Antibiotics can induce a broad range of morphological changes in bacterial cells including spheroplast, protoplast and ovoid cell formation, filamentation (cell elongation), localized swelling, bulge formation, blebbing, branching, bending, and twisting. Some of these changes are accompanied by altered antibiotic susceptibility or altered bacterial virulence. In patients treated with β-lactam antibiotics, for example, filamentous bacteria are commonly found in their clinical specimens. Filamentation is accompanied by both a decrease in antibiotic susceptibility and an increase in bacterial virulence. This has implications for both disease treatment and disease progression.

Antibiotics used to treat Burkholderia pseudomallei infection (melioidosis), for example β-lactams, fluoroquinolones and thymidine synthesis inhibitors, can induce filamentation and other physiological changes. The ability of some β-lactam antibiotics to induce bacterial filamentation is attributable to their inhibition of certain penicillin-binding proteins (PBPs). PBPs are responsible for assembly of the peptidoglycan network in the bacterial cell wall. Inhibition of PBP-2 changes normal cells to spheroplasts, while inhibition of PBP-3 changes normal cells to filaments. PBP-3 synthesizes the septum in dividing bacteria, so inhibition of PBP-3 leads to the incomplete formation of septa in dividing bacteria, resulting in cell elongation without separation. Ceftazidime, ofloxacin, trimethoprim and chloramphenicol have all been shown to induce filamentation. Treatment at or below the minimal inhibitory concentration (MIC) induces bacterial filamentation and decreases killing within human macrophages. B.pseudomallei filaments revert to normal forms when the antibiotics are removed, and daughter cells maintain cell-division capacity and viability when re-exposed to antibiotics. Thus, filamentation may be a bacterial survival strategy. In Pseudomonas aeruginosa, antibiotic-induced filamentation appears to trigger a change from normal growth phase to stationary growth phase. Filamentous bacteria also release more endotoxin (lipopolysaccharide), one of the toxins responsible for septic shock.

In addition to the mechanism described above, some antibiotics induce filamentation via the SOS response. During repair of DNA damage, the SOS response aids bacterial propagation by inhibiting cell division. DNA damage induces the SOS response in E.coli through the DpiBA two-component signal transduction system, leading to inactivation of the ftsL gene product, penicillin binding protein 3 (PBP-3). The ftsL gene is a group of filamentation temperature-sensitive genes used in cell division. Their product (PBP-3), as mentioned above, is a membrane transpeptidase required for peptidoglycan synthesis at the septum. Inactivation of the ftsL gene product requires the SOS-promoting recA and lexA genes as well as dpiA and transiently inhibits bacterial cell division. The DpiA is the effector for the DpiB two-component system. Interaction of DpiA with replication origins competes with the binding of the replication proteins DnaA and DnaB. When overexpressed, DpiA can interrupt DNA replication and induce the SOS response resulting in inhibition of cell division.

== Nutritional stress ==
Nutritional stress can change bacterial morphology. A common shape alteration is filamentation which can be triggered by a limited availability of one or more substrates, nutrients or electron acceptors. Since the filament can increase a cell's uptake–surface area without significantly changing its volume appreciably. Moreover, the filamentation benefits bacterial cells attaching to a surface because it increases specific surface area in direct contact with the solid medium. In addition, the filamentation may allows bacterial cells to access nutrients by enhancing the possibility that part of the filament will contact a nutrient-rich zone and pass compounds to the rest of the cell's biomass. For example, Actinomyces israelii grows as filamentous rods or branched in the absence of phosphate, cysteine, or glutathione. However, it returns to a regular rod-like morphology when adding back these nutrients.

== See also ==
- Filamentation
- Protoplasts
- Spheroplasts
