= James Baddiley =

British biochemist

- Born: 15 May 1918; Manchester, England
- Died: 19 November 2008 (aged 90); Cambridge, England
- Education: Manchester Grammar School
- Alma mater: Manchester University (PhD, 1944)
- Known for: Discoverer of Teichoic acids
- Awards: Meldola Medal (1947); Corday-Morgan Medal (1952); Tilden Medal (1959); Davy Medal (1974)
- Scientific career
- Fields: Chemistry; Organic Chemistry
- Institutions: Wenner-Gren Institute; Lister Institute of Preventive Medicine; Newcastle University

Sir James Baddiley FRS FRSE (15 May 1918, in Manchester – 17 November 2008, in Cambridge) was a British biochemist.

== Early life and education ==
Baddiley was born and brought up in Manchester. His father was director of research at the ICI dyestuffs division in Blackley. He attended Manchester Grammar School and Manchester University in 1937 to read chemistry obtaining a BSc and MSc. He was accepted as a PhD student by the Nobel prizewinner Alexander Todd.

== Career ==
Todd's group did fundamental work on the chemistry of nucleosides, nucleotides and nucleic acids. This formed the base for subsequent work on the role of these compounds in cell biology and heredity.

In 1944 he moved with Todd to Cambridge University and was awarded an ICI research fellowship. His work culminated in the first synthesis of adenosine triphosphate (ATP).

He then joined the Wenner-Gren Institute (now the Wenner-Gren Foundation for Anthropological Research) in Stockholm with a fellowship from the Swedish Medical Research Council. Later at the Lister Institute in London he established the structure of several nucleotide coenzymes, in particular coenzyme A (CoA). He then attended Harvard with a Rockefeller fellowship.

From 1954 to 1977 he was Professor of Organic Chemistry at King's College, University of Durham, now part of Newcastle University. From 1975 to 1983 he was Professor of Chemical Microbiology at Newcastle where he established the Microbiological Chemistry Research Laboratory (MCRL). The focus of his work was the biosynthesis, structure and biological function of various biochemical compounds, especially the discovery of teichoic acids, major components of cell wall structure of gram-positive bacteria.

In 1981, Baddiley became a founding member of the World Cultural Council.

After Newcastle he was awarded a senior research fellowship by the Science and Engineering Research Council, and moved to the biochemistry department at Cambridge. This led to the establishment of the Institute of Biotechnology of which he was the first chairman and he was also appointed a fellow of Pembroke College, Cambridge.

== Awards ==
In 1961 he became a Fellow of the Royal Society and in 1963 as Fellow of the Royal Society of Edinburgh. He was awarded the Davy Medal in 1974 with the citation: In recognition of his distinguished researches on coenzyme A and studies of the constituents of bacterial cell walls. He was knighted in 1977. Other awards were DSc (Manchester), ScD (Cantab), and Honorary DSc's from Heriot-Watt University(1979) and also the University of Bath (1986).

For his work at Newcastle University on teichoic acids, the recently built Baddiley-Clark building (housing bacterial cell biology research) was named in part after him.

== Personal life ==
In 1944, married Hazel Townsend (d 2007) a textile designer. They had a son, Christopher.
