= LCP family =

Cell envelope-related transcriptional attenuator domain (TagU catalytic domain)

Identifiers
- Symbol: LytR_cpsA_psr
- Pfam: PF03816
- InterPro: IPR004474
- CATH: 3tflA02
Available protein structures:
- PDB: IPR004474 PF03816 (ECOD; PDBsum)
- AlphaFold: IPR004474; PF03816

Polyisoprenyl-teichoic acid--peptidoglycan teichoic acid transferase TagU

Identifiers
- Symbol: TagU
- InterPro: IPR023734
Available protein structures:
- PDB: IPR023734
- AlphaFold: IPR023734
- describes same family; this is the full-length protein

LytR/CpsA/Psr, C-terminal domain

Identifiers
- Symbol: LytR_C
- Pfam: PF13399
- InterPro: IPR027381
Available protein structures:
- PDB: IPR027381 PF13399 (ECOD; PDBsum)
- AlphaFold: IPR027381; PF13399

The LCP family or TagU family of proteins is a conserved family of phosphotransferases that are involved in the attachment of teichoic acid (TA) molecules to gram-positive cell wall or cell membrane. It was initially thought as the LytR (lytic repressor) component of a LytABC operon encoding autolysins, but the mechanism of regulation was later realized to be the production of TA molecules. It was accordingly renamed TagU.

The "LCP" acronym derives from three proteins initially identified to contain this domain, LytR (now TagU, Q02115), cpsA ("Capsular polysaccharide expression regulator"), and psr ("PBP 5 synthesis repressor"). These proteins were mistaken as transcriptional regulators via different reasons, but all three of them are now known to be TagU-like enzymes. While TagU itself only attaches TA molecules to the peptidoglycan cell wall (forming WTA), other LCP proteins may glycosylate cell wall proteins (A. oris LcpA, PDB: 5V8C) or attach TA molecules to a cell membrane anchor (forming LTA). Most, if not all, LCP proteins also have a secondary pyrophosphatase activity.

Typical TagU proteins are made up of an N-terminal transmembrane domain (for anchoring), an optional, non-conserved accessory domain (CATH 3tflA01), a core catalytic domain, and sometimes a C-terminal domain for which the structure is unknown. The core LCP domain is a magnesium-dependent enzyme.
