= Staphylococcus borealis =

Scientific classification
- Domain: Bacteria
- Kingdom: Bacillati
- Phylum: Bacillota
- Class: Bacilli
- Order: Bacillales
- Family: Staphylococcaceae
- Genus: Staphylococcus
- Species: S. borealis

Binomial name
- Staphylococcus borealis Pain et al. 2020

Type strain
- 51-48

Species of bacterium

Staphylococcus borealis is a bacterial species, member of the genus Staphylococcus, closely related to Staphylococcus haemolyticus and described in 2020. Its cells are Gram positive, coccoid in shape, with a diameter of 0.65 to 1.23 μm and form clusters. Additionally, they are facultative anaerobic, coagulase negative and catalase positive. The type strain (51-48^{T} = CCUG 73747^{T} = CECT 30011^{T}) was isolated from human blood culture at the University Hospital of North Norway (Tromsø, Norway), in 1997. Four additional strains included in the description were isolated from skin swabs, from healthy volunteers. The genome sequence of the type strain is deposited in DNA Data Bank of Japan, European Nucleotide Archive and GenBank under the accession number JABVEJ000000000.

Additionally, three publicly available draft genome sequences were also identified as S. borealis, two of which were from strains isolated from cattle in Canada and the other a strain isolated from human skin in Denmark.
