= Glycerol dehydratase =

Class of enzymes

glycerol dehydratase

Identifiers
- EC no.: 4.2.1.30
- CAS no.: 9077-68-3

Databases
- IntEnz: IntEnz view
- BRENDA: BRENDA entry
- ExPASy: NiceZyme view
- KEGG: KEGG entry
- MetaCyc: metabolic pathway
- PRIAM: profile
- PDB structures: RCSB PDB PDBe PDBsum
- Gene Ontology: AmiGO / QuickGO
Search
- PMC: articles
- PubMed: articles
- NCBI: proteins

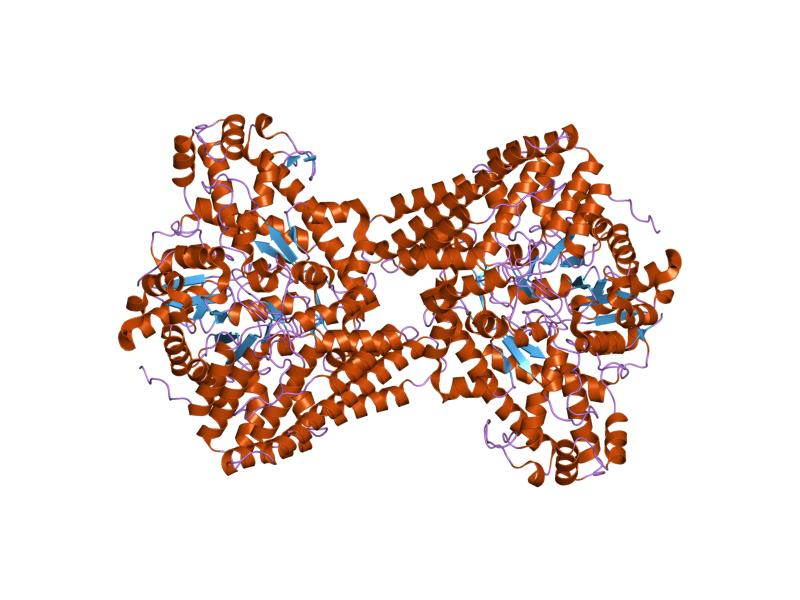
Representation of molecular structure of the protein registered with 1r8w code.

In enzymology, a glycerol dehydratase (EC 4.2.1.30) catalyzes the chemical reaction:

glycerol ⇌ 3-hydroxypropanal + H_{2}O

This enzyme belongs to the family of lyases, specifically the hydro-lyases, which cleave carbon-oxygen bonds. The systematic name of this enzyme class is glycerol hydro-lyase (3-hydroxypropanol-forming). Other names in common use include glycerol dehydrase, and glycerol hydro-lyase. This enzyme participates in glycerolipid metabolism. It employs one cofactor, cobalamin.

== Structural studies ==
As of late 2007, two structures have been solved for this class of enzymes, with PDB accession codes 1IWP and 1MMF.
