= CDP-glycerol glycerophosphotransferase =

Identifiers
- EC no.: 2.7.8.12
- CAS no.: 9076-71-5

Databases
- IntEnz: IntEnz view
- BRENDA: BRENDA entry
- ExPASy: NiceZyme view
- KEGG: KEGG entry
- MetaCyc: metabolic pathway
- PRIAM: profile
- PDB structures: RCSB PDB PDBe PDBsum
- Gene Ontology: AmiGO / QuickGO
Search
- PMC: articles
- PubMed: articles
- NCBI: proteins

In enzymology, a CDP-glycerol glycerophosphotransferase (EC 2.7.8.12) is an enzyme that catalyzes the chemical reaction

CDP-glycerol + (glycerophosphate)_{n} $\rightleftharpoons$ CMP + (glycerophosphate)_{n+1}

Thus, the two substrates of this enzyme are CDP-glycerol and (glycerophosphate)n, whereas its two products are CMP and (glycerophosphate)n+1.

This enzyme belongs to the family of transferases, specifically those transferring non-standard substituted phosphate groups. The systematic name of this enzyme class is CDP-glycerol:poly(glycerophosphate) glycerophosphotransferase. Other names in common use include teichoic-acid synthase, cytidine diphosphoglycerol glycerophosphotransferase, poly(glycerol phosphate) polymerase, teichoic acid glycerol transferase, glycerophosphate synthetase, and CGPTase.
