= Protoplast =

Cell stripped of cell-wall

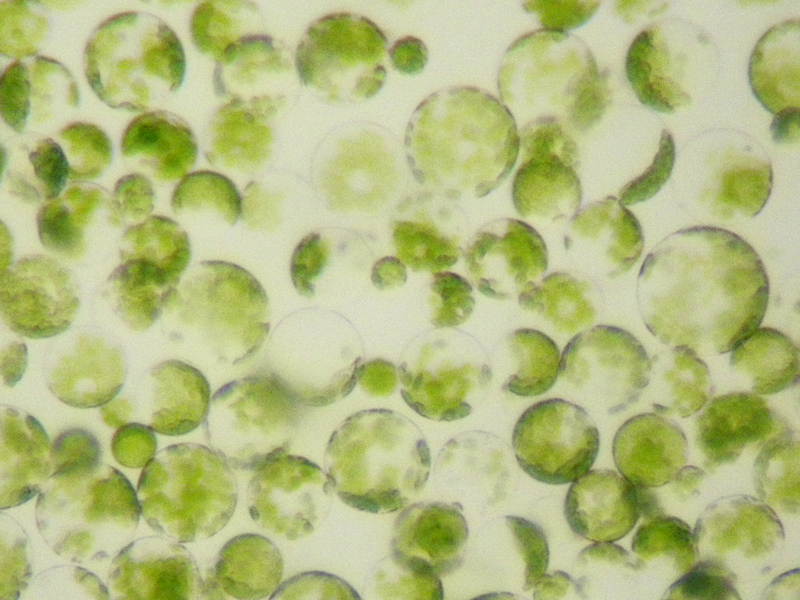
Protoplasts of cells from a petunia's leaf

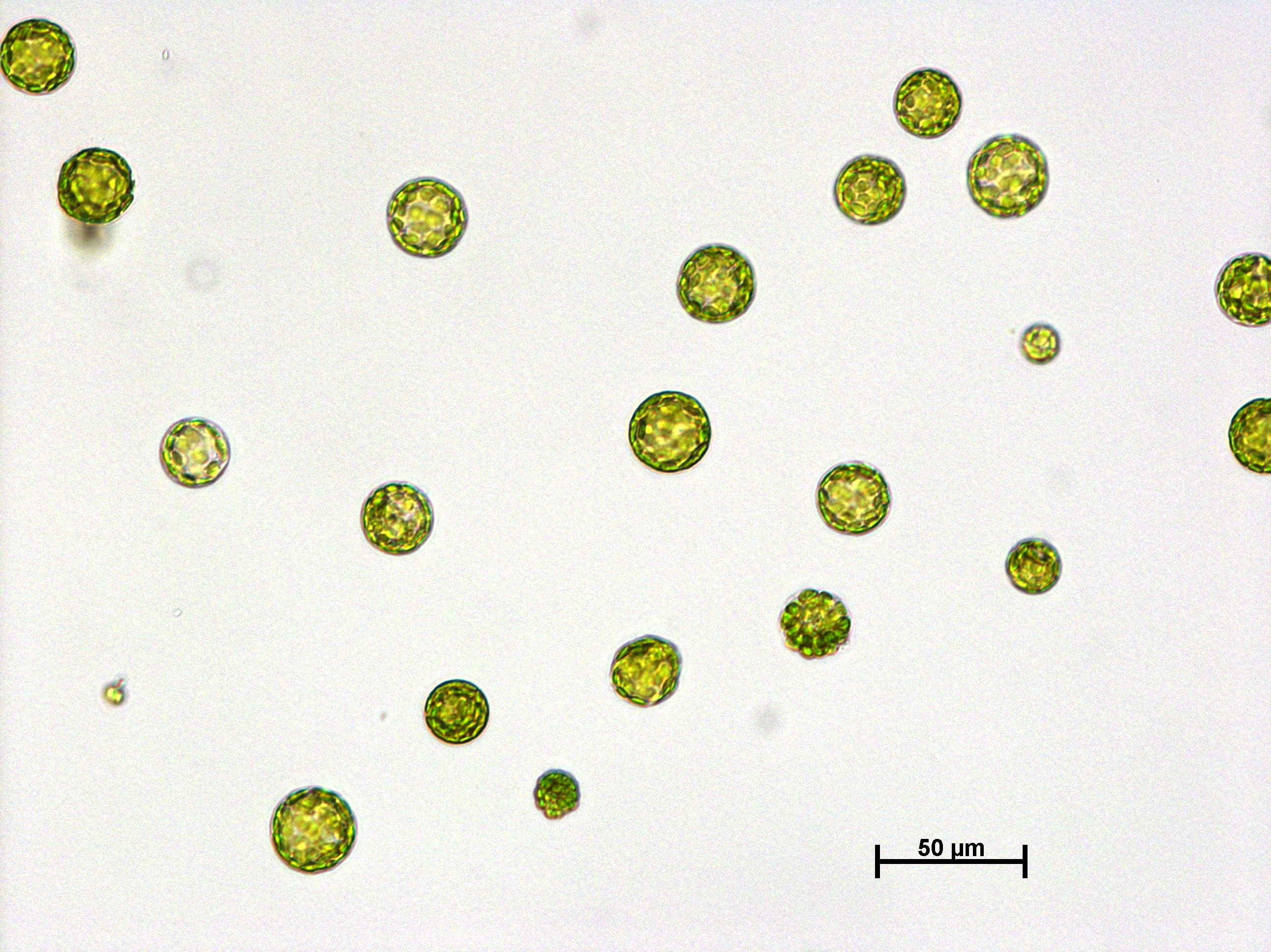
Protoplasts of the moss Physcomitrella patens

Protoplast (from Ancient Greek πρωτόπλαστος (prōtóplastos) 'first-formed'), is a biological term coined by Hanstein in 1880 to refer to the entire cell, excluding the cell wall. Protoplasts can be generated by stripping the cell wall from plant, bacterial, or fungal cells by mechanical, chemical or enzymatic means.

Protoplasts differ from spheroplasts in that their cell wall has been completely removed. Spheroplasts retain part of their cell wall. In the case of Gram-negative bacterial spheroplasts, for example, the peptidoglycan component of the cell wall has been removed but the outer membrane component has not.

== Enzymes for the preparation of protoplasts ==
Cell walls are made of a variety of polysaccharides. Protoplasts can be made by degrading cell walls with a mixture of the appropriate polysaccharide-degrading enzymes:

Type of cell	Enzyme
Plant cells	Cellulase, pectinase, xylanase
Gram-positive bacteria	Lysozyme, N,O-diacetylmuramidase, lysostaphin
Fungal cells	Chitinase

During and subsequent to digestion of the cell wall, the protoplast becomes very sensitive to osmotic stress. This means cell wall digestion and protoplast storage must be done in an isotonic solution to prevent rupture of the plasma membrane.

== Uses for protoplasts ==
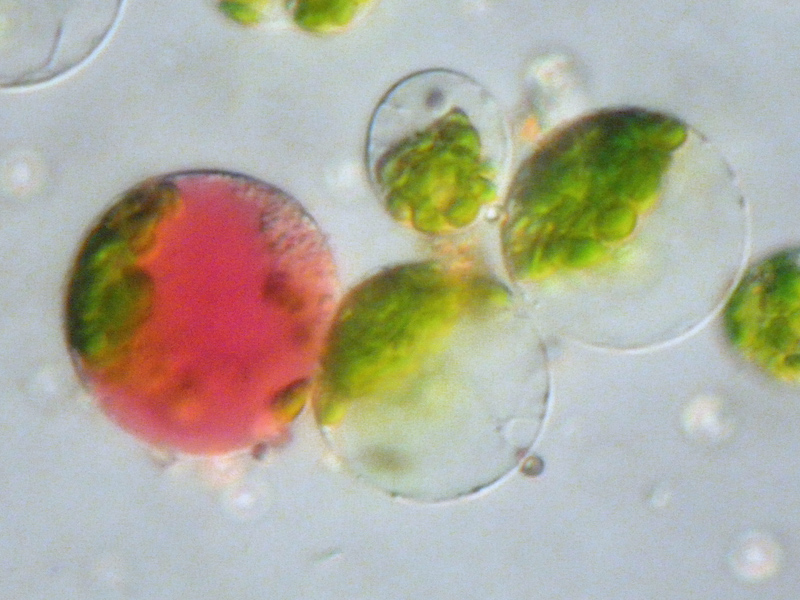
Fused protoplast (on left), containing both chloroplasts (from a leaf cell) as well as a coloured vacuole (from a petal).

Protoplasts can be used to study membrane biology, including the uptake of macromolecules and viruses . These are also used in somaclonal variation.

Protoplasts are widely used for DNA transformation (for making genetically modified organisms), since the cell wall would otherwise block the passage of DNA into the cell. In the case of plant cells, protoplasts may be regenerated into whole plants first by growing into a group of plant cells that develops into a callus and then by regeneration of shoots (caulogenesis) from the callus using plant tissue culture methods. Growth of protoplasts into callus and regeneration of shoots requires the proper balance of plant growth regulators in the tissue culture medium that must be customized for each species of plant. Unlike protoplasts from vascular plants, protoplasts from mosses, such as Physcomitrella patens, do not need phytohormones for regeneration, nor do they form a callus during regeneration. Instead, they regenerate directly into the filamentous protonema, mimicking a germinating moss spore.

Protoplasts may also be used for plant breeding, using a technique called protoplast fusion. Protoplasts from different species are induced to fuse by using an electric field or a solution of polyethylene glycol. This technique may be used to generate somatic hybrids in tissue culture.

Additionally, protoplasts of plants expressing fluorescent proteins in certain cells may be used for Fluorescence Activated Cell Sorting (FACS), where only cells fluorescing a selected wavelength are retained. Among other things, this technique is used to isolate specific cell types (e.g., guard cells from leaves, pericycle cells from roots) for further investigations, such as transcriptomics.

== See also ==
- Bacterial morphological plasticity
- L-form bacteria
- Spheroplasts
