= Lactivicin =

Chemical compound

Names
- IUPAC name 2-(4-Acetamido-3-oxo-1,2-oxazolidin-2-yl)-5-oxooxolane-2-carboxylic acid

Identifiers
CAS Number	107167-31-7
3D model (JSmol)	Interactive image
ChEMBL	ChEMBL1909427
ChemSpider	8057612
PubChem CID	9881937
CompTox Dashboard (EPA)	DTXSID50910246
- InChI: InChI=1S/C10H12N2O7/c1-5(13)11-6-4-18-12(8(6)15)10(9(16)17)3-2-7(14)19-10/h6H,2-4H2,1H3,(H,11,13)(H,16,17) Key: ZUEKKUYIXILDAF-UHFFFAOYSA-N
- SMILES: CC(=O)NC1CON(C1=O)C2(CCC(=O)O2)C(=O)O

Properties
Chemical formula	C_{10}H_{12}N_{2}O_{7}
Molar mass	272.213 g·mol^{−1}
- Except where otherwise noted, data are given for materials in their standard state (at 25 °C [77 °F], 100 kPa). Infobox references

Lactivicin is a non-beta-lactam antibiotic that is active against a range of Gram-positive and Gram-negative bacteria. Lactivicin demonstrates a similar affinity for penicillin-binding proteins to beta-lactam antibiotics and is also susceptible to beta-lactamase enzymes.
