= Glycerol phosphate =

Glycerol phosphate may refer to:

- Glycerol 1-phosphate
- Glycerol 2-phosphate
- Glycerol 3-phosphate
