= Ribitol =

Names
- IUPAC name D-Ribitol
- Systematic IUPAC name (2R,3S,4S)-Pentane-1,2,3,4,5-pentol
- Other names (2R,3S,4S)-Pentane-1,2,3,4,5-pentaol (not recommended); Adonit; Adonite; Adonitol; Adonitrol; Pentitol; 1,2,3,4,5-Pentanepentol; 1,2,3,4,5-Pentanol; Pentane-1,2,3,4,5-pentol

Identifiers
CAS Number	488-81-3
3D model (JSmol)	Interactive image
Beilstein Reference	1720524
ChEBI	CHEBI:15963
ChEMBL	ChEMBL3137744
ChemSpider	10254628
ECHA InfoCard	100.006.987
EC Number	207-685-7
Gmelin Reference	82894
KEGG	C00474
PubChem CID	827
UNII	353ZQ9TVDA
CompTox Dashboard (EPA)	DTXSID601032335
- InChI: InChI=1S/C5H12O5/c6-1-3(8)5(10)4(9)2-7/h3-10H,1-2H2/t3-,4+,5- Key: HEBKCHPVOIAQTA-ZXFHETKHSA-N; InChI=1/C5H12O5/c6-1-3(8)5(10)4(9)2-7/h3-10H,1-2H2/t3-,4+,5-
- SMILES: O[C@H](CO)[C@@H](O)[C@@H](O)CO

Properties
Chemical formula	C_{5}H_{12}O_{5}
Molar mass	152.146 g·mol^{−1}
Melting point	102 °C (216 °F; 375 K)
Magnetic susceptibility (χ)	−91.30·10^{−6} cm^{3}/mol
- Except where otherwise noted, data are given for materials in their standard state (at 25 °C [77 °F], 100 kPa). verify (what is ?) Infobox references

Ribitol, or adonitol, is a crystalline pentose alcohol (C_{5}H_{12}O_{5}) formed by the reduction of ribose. It occurs naturally in the plant Adonis vernalis as well as in the cell walls of some Gram-positive bacteria, in the form of ribitol phosphate, in teichoic acids. It also forms part of the chemical structure of riboflavin and flavin mononucleotide (FMN), which is a nucleotide coenzyme used by many enzymes, the so-called flavoproteins.

Ribitol is one of four stereoisomers having the formula C_{5}H_{12}O_{5}:

- D-arabitol and L-arabitol
- Ribitol (non-chiral)
- Xylitol (non-chiral)
