= Filamentation =

Type of bacteria growth

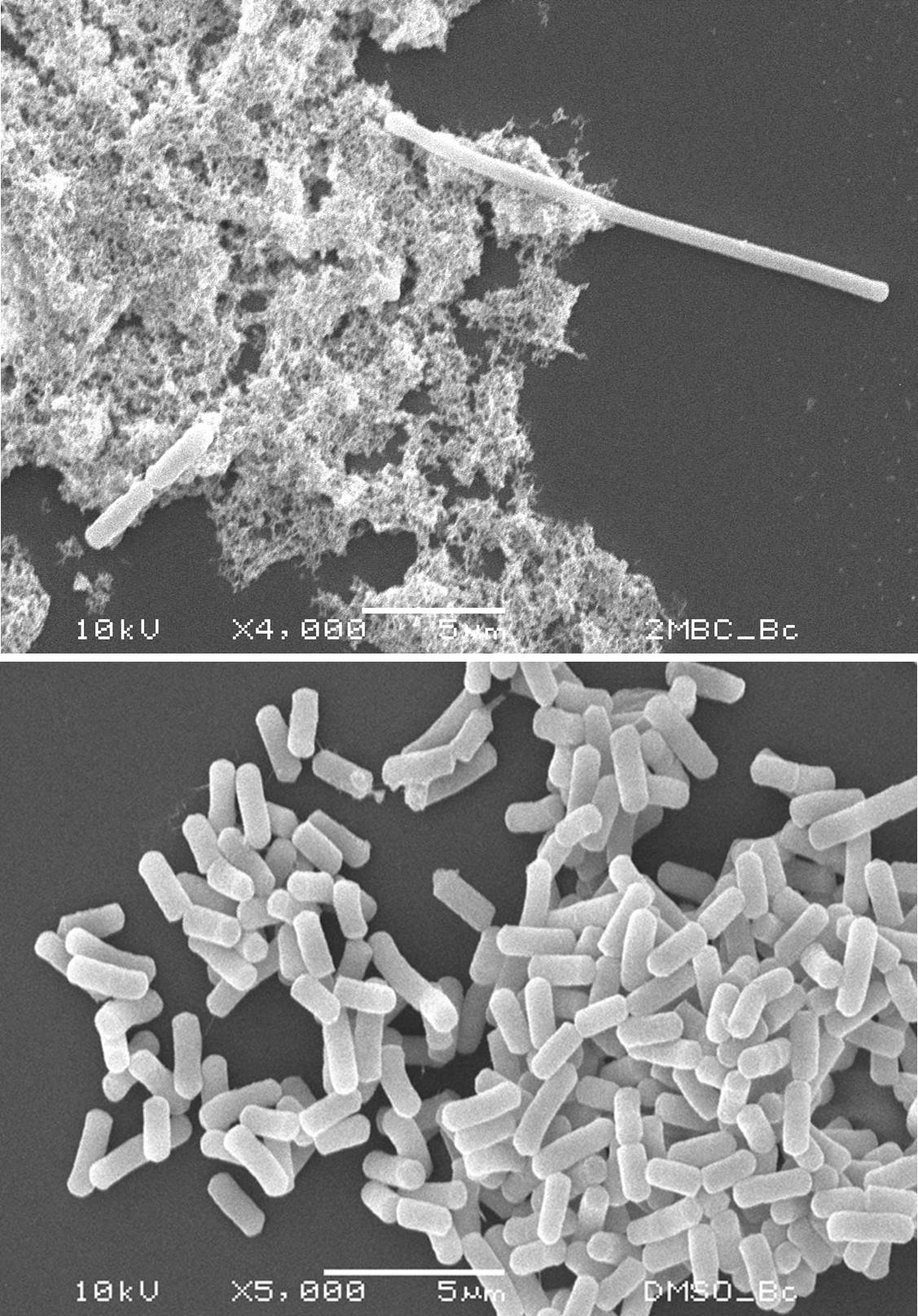
A Bacillus cereus cell that has undergone filamentation following antibacterial treatment (upper electron micrograph; top right) and regularly sized cells of untreated B. cereus (lower electron micrograph)

Filamentation is the anomalous growth of certain bacteria, such as Escherichia coli, in which cells continue to elongate but do not divide (no septa formation). The cells that result from elongation without division have multiple chromosomal copies.

In the absence of antibiotics or other stressors, filamentation occurs at a low frequency in bacterial populations (4–8% short filaments and 0–5% long filaments in 1- to 8-hour cultures). The increased cell length can protect bacteria from protozoan predation and neutrophil phagocytosis by making ingestion of cells more difficult. Filamentation is also thought to protect bacteria from antibiotics, and is associated with other aspects of bacterial virulence such as biofilm formation.

The number and length of filaments within a bacterial population increases when the bacteria are exposed to different physical, chemical and biological agents (e.g. UV light, DNA synthesis-inhibiting antibiotics, bacteriophages). This is termed conditional filamentation. Some of the key genes involved in filamentation in E. coli include sulA, minCD and damX.

== Filament formation ==
=== Antibiotic-induced filamentation ===
Some peptidoglycan synthesis inhibitors (e.g. cefuroxime, ceftazidime) induce filamentation by inhibiting the penicillin binding proteins (PBPs) responsible for crosslinking peptidoglycan at the septal wall (e.g. PBP3 in E. coli and P. aeruginosa). Because the PBPs responsible for lateral wall synthesis are relatively unaffected by cefuroxime and ceftazidime, cell elongation proceeds without any cell division and filamentation is observed.

DNA synthesis-inhibiting and DNA damaging antibiotics (e.g. metronidazole, mitomycin C, the fluoroquinolones, novobiocin) induce filamentation via the SOS response. The SOS response inhibits septum formation until the DNA can be repaired, this delay stopping the transmission of damaged DNA to progeny. Bacteria inhibit septation by synthesizing protein SulA, an FtsZ inhibitor that halts Z-ring formation, thereby stopping recruitment and activation of PBP3. If bacteria are deprived of the nucleobase thymine by treatment with folic acid synthesis inhibitors (e.g. trimethoprim), this also disrupts DNA synthesis and induces SOS-mediated filamentation. Direct obstruction of Z-ring formation by SulA and other FtsZ inhibitors (e.g. berberine) induces filamentation too.

Some protein synthesis inhibitors (e.g. kanamycin), RNA synthesis inhibitors (e.g. bicyclomycin) and membrane disruptors (e.g. daptomycin, polymyxin B) cause filamentation too, but these filaments are much shorter than the filaments induced by the above antibiotics.

=== Stress-induced filamentation ===
Filamentation is often a consequence of environmental stress. It has been observed in response to temperature shocks, low water availability, high osmolarity, extreme pH, and UV exposure. UV light damages bacterial DNA and induces filamentation via the SOS response. Starvation can also cause bacterial filamentation. For example, if bacteria are deprived of the nucleobase thymine, this disrupts DNA synthesis and induces SOS-mediated filamentation.

=== Nutrient-induced filamentation ===
Several macronutrients and biomolecules can cause bacterial cells to filament, including the amino acids glutamine, proline and arginine, and some branched-chain amino acids. Certain bacterial species, such as Paraburkholderia elongata, will also filament as a result of a tendency to accumulate phosphate in the form of polyphosphate, which can chelate metal cofactors needed by division proteins. In addition, filamentation is induced by nutrient-rich conditions in the intracellular pathogen Bordetella atropi. This occurs via the highly conserved UDP-glucose pathway. UDP-glucose biosynthesis and sensing suppresses bacterial cell division, with the ensuing filamentation allowing B. atropi to spread to neighboring cells.

=== Intrinsic dysbiosis-induced filamentation ===
Filamentation can also be induced by other pathways affecting thymidylate synthesis. For instance, partial loss of dihydrofolate reductase (DHFR) activity causes reversible filamentation. DHFR has a critical role in regulating the amount of tetrahydrofolate, which is essential for purine and thymidylate synthesis. DHFR activity can be inhibited by mutations or by high concentrations of the antibiotic trimethoprim (see antibiotic-induced filamentation above).

Overcrowding of the periplasm or envelope can also induce filamentation in Gram-negative bacteria by disrupting normal divisome function.

=== Filamentation and biotic interactions ===
Several examples of filamentation that result from biotic interactions between bacteria and other organisms or infectious agents have been reported. Filamentous cells are resistant to ingestion by bacterivores, and environmental conditions generated during predation can trigger filamentation. Filamentation can also be induced by signalling factors produced by other bacteria. In addition, Agrobacterium spp. filament in proximity to plant roots, and E. coli filaments when exposed to plant extracts. Lastly, bacteriophage infection can result in filamentation via the expression of proteins that inhibit divisome assembly.

== See also ==
- Bacterial morphological plasticity
- Filamentous bacteriophage
- Filamentous cyanobacteria
- Segmented filamentous bacteria
