= Antistaphylococcal penicillins =

Class of chemical compounds

Antistaphylococcal penicillins are a chemical compound. They are a class of Beta lactam antibiotics used to treat infections caused by bacteria.

== History ==
Penicillin resistance in Staphylococcus aureus appeared very soon after penicillin entered general clinical use in 1943, and the mechanism of resistance was the production of β-lactamase. Modification of the penicillin molecule so that it was resistant to being broken down by β-lactamase was able to temporarily overcome this problem.

These compounds became known as antistaphylococcal penicillins. The first of these compounds was methicillin, which is no longer in general use. The range of these penicillins available in each country is very different, and the reasons for this are historical.

== Penicillin family ==
- Cloxacillin (Canada)
- Flucloxacillin (UK and Australia)
- Dicloxacillin (US)
- Methicillin (Withdrawn; was once sold in UK)
- Nafcillin (US)
- Oxacillin (US)

== See also ==
- History of penicillin
- List of antibiotics
- Side effects of penicillin
