= ATCvet code QJ51 =

Veterinary medical products classification subgroup

ATCvet code QJ51 Antibacterials for intramammary use is a therapeutic subgroup of the Anatomical Therapeutic Chemical Classification System for veterinary medicinal products, a system of alphanumeric codes developed by the World Health Organization (WHO) for the classification of drugs and other medical products for veterinary use. Subgroup QJ51 is part of the anatomical group QJ Antiinfectives for systemic use.

National versions of the ATC classification may include additional codes not present in this list, which follows the WHO version.

== QJ51A Tetracyclines for intramammary use ==
=== QJ51AA Tetracyclines ===
QJ51AA03 Chlortetracycline
QJ51AA06 Oxytetracycline
QJ51AA07 Tetracycline
QJ51AA53 Chlortetracycline, combinations

== QJ51B Amphenicols for intramammary use ==
=== QJ51BA Amphenicols ===
QJ51BA01 Chloramphenicol
QJ51BA02 Thiamphenicol
QJ51BA90 Florfenicol

== QJ51C Beta-lactam antibacterials, penicillins, for intramammary use ==
=== QJ51CA Penicillins with extended spectrum ===
QJ51CA01 Ampicillin
QJ51CA51 Ampicillin, combinations

=== QJ51CE Beta-lactamase sensitive penicillins ===
QJ51CE01 Benzylpenicillin
QJ51CE09 Procaine penicillin
QJ51CE59 Procaine penicillin, combinations
QJ51CE90 Phenetamate

=== QJ51CF Beta-lactamase resistant penicillins ===
QJ51CF01 Dicloxacillin
QJ51CF02 Cloxacillin
QJ51CF03 Meticillin
QJ51CF04 Oxacillin
QJ51CF05 Flucloxacillin

=== QJ51CR Combinations of pencillins and/or beta-lactamase inhibitors ===
QJ51CR01 Ampicillin and enzyme inhibitor
QJ51CR02 Amoxicillin and enzyme inhibitor
QJ51CR50 Combinations of penicillins

== QJ51D Other beta-lactam antibacterials for intramammary use ==
=== QJ51DB First-generation cephalosporins ===
QJ51DB01 Cefalexin
QJ51DB04 Cefazolin
QJ51DB08 Cefapirin
QJ51DB10 Cefacetrile
QJ51DB90 Cefalonium

=== QJ51DC Second-generation cephalosporins ===
QJ51DC02 Cefuroxime

=== QJ51DD Third-generation cephalosporins ===
QJ51DD12 Cefoperazone
QJ51DD90 Ceftiofur

=== QJ51DE Fourth-generation cephalosporins ===
QJ51DE90 Cefquinome

== QJ51E sulfonamides and trimethoprim for intramammary use ==
=== QJ51EA Trimethoprim and derivatives ===
QJ51EA01 Trimethoprim

== QJ51F Macrolides and lincosamides for intramammary use ==
=== QJ51FA Macrolides ===
QJ51FA01 Erythromycin
QJ51FA02 Spiramycin
QJ51FA90 Tylosin

=== QJ51FF Lincosamides ===
QJ51FF90 Pirlimycin
QJ51FF02 Lincomycin

== QJ51G Aminoglycoside antibacterials for intramammary use ==
=== QJ51GA Streptomycins ===
QJ51GA90 Dihydrostreptomycin

=== QJ51GB Other aminoglycosides ===
QJ51GB03 Gentamicin
QJ51GB90 Apramycin

== QJ51R Combination of antibacterials for intramammary use ==
=== QJ51RA Tetracyclines, combinations with other antibacterials ===
QJ51RA01 Chlortetracycline, combinations with other antibacterials

=== QJ51RB Amphenicols, combinations with other antibacterials ===
QJ51RB01 Chloramphenicol, combinations with other antibacterials

=== QJ51RC Beta-lactam antibacterials, penicillins, combinations with other antibacterials ===
QJ51RC04 Procaine penicillin, dihydrostreptomycin, sulfadimidin
QJ51RC20 Ampicillin, combinations with other antibacterials
QJ51RC21 Pivampicillin, combinations with other antibacterials
QJ51RC22 Benzylpenicillin, combinations with other antibacterials
QJ51RC23 Procaine penicillin, combinations with other antibacterials
QJ51RC24 Benzathine benzylpenicillin, combinations with other antibacterials
QJ51RC25 Penethamate hydroiodide, combinations with other antibacterials
QJ51RC26 Cloxacillin, combinations with other antibacterials

=== QJ51RD Other beta-lactam antibacterials, combinations with other antibacterials ===
QJ51RD01 Cefalexin, combinations with other antibacterials
QJ51RD34 Cefacetrile, combinations with other antibacterials

=== QJ51RE Sulfonamides and trimethoprim including derivatives ===
QJ51RE01 Sulfadiazine and trimethoprim

=== QJ51RF Macrolides and lincosamides, combinations with other antibacterials ===
QJ51RF01 Spiramycin, combinations with other antibacterials
QJ51RF02 Erythromycin, combinations with other antibacterials
QJ51RF03 Lincomycin, combinations with other antibacterials

=== QJ51RG Aminoglycoside antibacterials, combinations ===
QJ51RG01 Neomycin, combinations with other antibacterials

=== QJ51RV Combinations of antibacterials and other substances ===
QJ51RV01 Antibacterials and corticosteroids
QJ51RV02 Antibacterials, antimycotics and corticosteroids

== QJ51X Other antibacterials for intramammary use ==
=== QJ51XB Polymyxins ===
QJ51XB01 Colistin
QJ51XB02 Polymyxin B

=== QJ51XX Other antibacterials for intramammary use ===
QJ51XX01 Rifaximin
