= QJ =

QJ may refer to:

- QJ (New York City Subway service), a defunct rapid transit service (1960–1973)
- ATCvet code QJ (Antiinfectives for systemic use), a veterinary medication class
- China Railways QJ, a Chinese steam rail locomotive class (built 1956–1988)
- Quarterly Journal of Austrian Economics, since 1998, by the Mises Institute
- Quarterly Journal of Economics, since 1886, by Harvard University
- QJ, a UHF IMTS radio frequency
