= C19H18ClN3O5S =

The molecular formula C_{19}H_{18}ClN_{3}O_{5}S (molar mass: 435.881 g/mol, exact mass: 435.0656 u) may refer to:

- Cloxacillin
- Rivaroxaban
