= Oxacillin =

Antibiotic derived from Penicillin

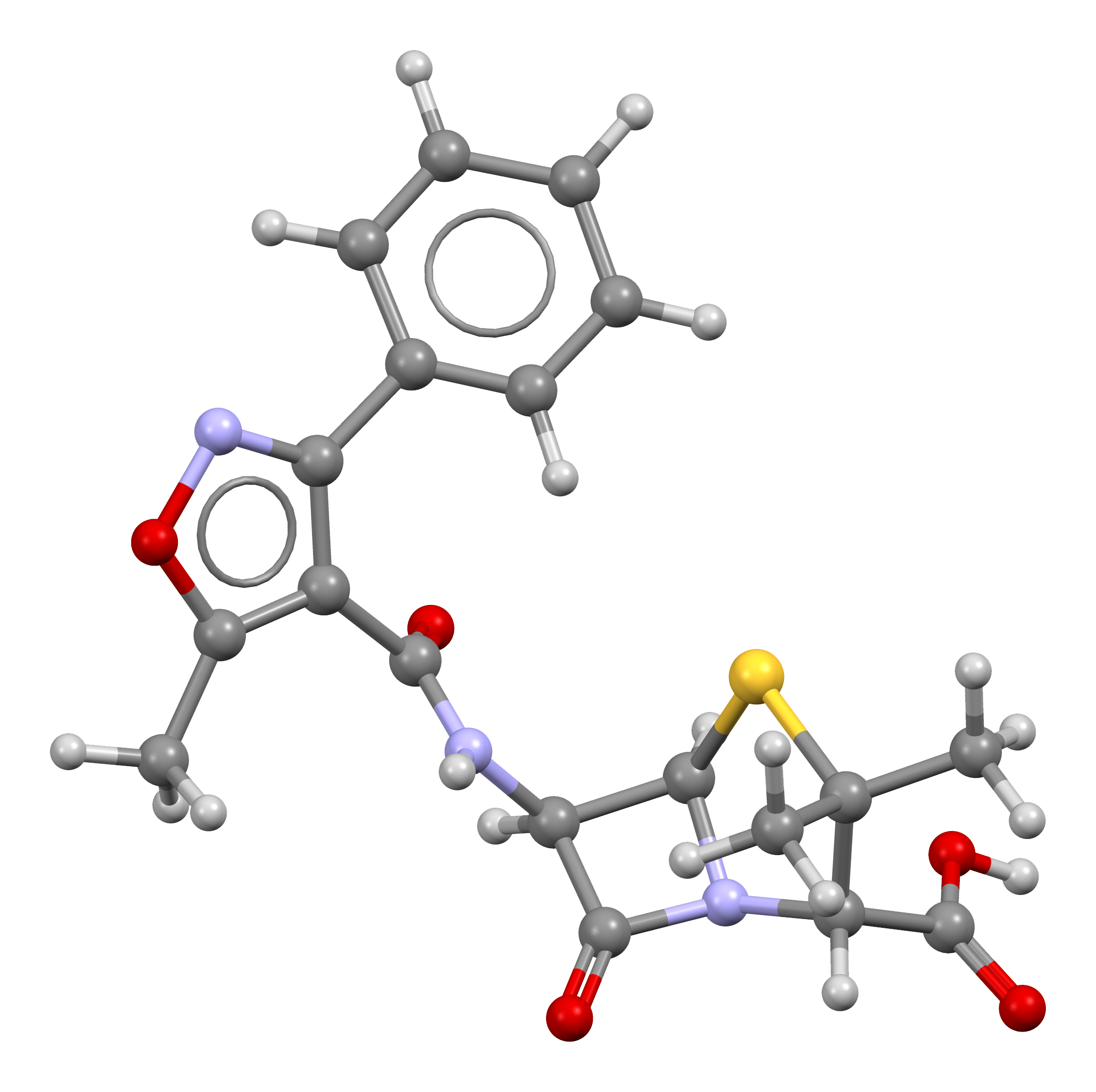

Clinical data
- Trade names: Bactocill
- AHFS/Drugs.com: Monograph
- MedlinePlus: a685020
- ATC code: J01CF04 (WHO) QJ51CF04 (WHO)

Identifiers
- IUPAC name: (2S,5R,6R)-3,3-dimethyl-6-[(5-methyl-3-phenyl- 1,2-oxazole-4-carbonyl)amino]-7-oxo-4-thia-1- azabicyclo[3.2.0]heptane-2-carboxylic acid
- CAS Number: 66-79-5
- PubChem CID: 6196
- DrugBank: DB00713
- ChemSpider: 5961
- UNII: UH95VD7V76
- KEGG: D08307
- ChEBI: CHEBI:7809
- ChEMBL: ChEMBL819
- CompTox Dashboard (EPA): DTXSID8023397
- ECHA InfoCard: 100.000.577

Chemical and physical data
- Formula: C_{19}H_{19}N_{3}O_{5}S
- Molar mass: 401.44 g·mol^{−1}
- 3D model (JSmol): Interactive image
- Density: 1.49 g/cm^{3}
- Boiling point: 686.8 °C (1,268.2 °F)
- SMILES: [H][C@]12SC(C)(C)[C@@H](N1C(=O)[C@H]2NC(=O)C1=C(C)ON=C1C1=CC=CC=C1)C(O)=O
- InChI: InChI=1S/C19H19N3O5S/c1-9-11(12(21-27-9)10-7-5-4-6-8-10)15(23)20-13-16(24)22-14(18(25)26)19(2,3)28-17(13)22/h4-8,13-14,17H,1-3H3,(H,20,23)(H,25,26)/t13-,14+,17-/m1/s1; Key:UWYHMGVUTGAWSP-JKIFEVAISA-N

Oxacillin (trade name Bactocill) is a narrow-spectrum second-generation beta-lactam antibiotic of the penicillin class developed by Beecham.

It was patented in 1960 and approved for medical use in 1962.

== Medical uses ==
Oxacillin is a penicillinase-resistant β-lactam. It is similar to methicillin, and has replaced methicillin in clinical use. Other related compounds are nafcillin, cloxacillin, dicloxacillin, and flucloxacillin. Since it is resistant to penicillinase enzymes, such as that produced by Staphylococcus aureus, it is widely used clinically in the US to treat penicillin-resistant Staphylococcus aureus. However, with the introduction and widespread use of both oxacillin and methicillin, antibiotic-resistant strains called methicillin-resistant and oxacillin-resistant Staphylococcus aureus (MRSA/ORSA) have become increasingly prevalent worldwide. MRSA/ORSA can be treated with vancomycin or other new antibiotics.

== Contraindications ==
The use of oxacillin is contraindicated in individuals that have experienced a hypersensitivity reaction to any medication in the penicillin family of antibiotics. Cross-allergenicity has been documented in individuals taking oxacillin that experienced a previous hypersensitivity reaction when given cephalosporins and cephamycins.

== Adverse effects ==
Commonly reported adverse effects associated with the use of oxacillin include skin rash, diarrhea, nausea, vomiting, hematuria, agranulocytosis, eosinophilia, leukopenia, neutropenia, thrombocytopenia, hepatotoxicity, acute interstitial nephritis, and fever. High doses of oxacillin have been reported to cause renal, hepatic, and nervous system toxicity. Common to all members of the penicillin class of drugs, oxacillin may cause acute or delayed hypersensitivity reactions. As an injection, oxacillin may cause injection site reactions, which may be characterized by redness, swelling, and itching.

== Pharmacology ==
=== Mechanism of action ===
Oxacillin, through its β-lactam ring, covalently binds to penicillin-binding proteins, which are enzymes involved in the synthesis of the bacterial cell wall. This binding interaction interferes with the transpeptidation reaction and inhibits the synthesis of peptidoglycan, a prominent component of the cell wall. By decreasing the integrity of the bacterial cell wall, it is thought that oxacillin and other penicillins kill actively growing bacteria through cell autolysis.

== Chemistry ==
As with other members of the penicillin family, the chemical structure of oxacillin features a 6-aminopenicillanic acid nucleus with a substituent attached to the amino group. The 6-aminopenicillanic acid nucleus consists of a thiazolidine ring attached to a β-lactam ring, which is the active moiety responsible for the antibacterial activity of the penicillin family. The substituent present on oxacillin is thought to impart resistance to degradation via bacterial β-lactamases.

== History ==
Oxacillin, a derivative of methicillin, was first synthesized in the early 1960s as part of a research initiative led by Peter Doyle and John Naylor of Beecham, in consort with Bristol-Myers. Members of the isoxazolyl penicillin family, which includes cloxacillin, dicloxacillin, and oxacillin, were synthesized to counter the increasing prevalence of infections caused by penicillin-resistant Staphylococcus aureus. While methicillin could only be administered via injection, the isoxazolyl penicillins, including oxacillin, could be given orally or by injection. Following the synthesis of cloxacillin and oxacillin, Beecham retained the right to commercially develop cloxacillin in the United Kingdom while Bristol-Myers was given the marketing rights for oxacillin in the United States.

== Society and culture ==
=== U.S. Food and Drug Administration approval history ===
- April 8, 1971: Oxacillin Sodium Injectable
  - Applicant: Sandoz
- July 27, 1973: Bactocill Capsule
  - Applicant: GlaxoSmithKline
- March 10, 1980: Oxacillin Sodium Capsule
  - Applicant: Ani Pharms Inc
- May 15, 1980: Oxacillin Sodium for Solution
  - Applicant: TEVA
- June 2, 1981: Bactocill for Solution
  - Applicant: GlaxoSmithKline
- December 23, 1986: Oxacillin Sodium Powder
  - Applicant: Sandoz
- September 29, 1988: Oxacillin Sodium Injectable
  - Applicant: Watson Labs Inc
- October 26, 1988: Oxacillin Sodium Injectable
  - Applicant: Watson Labs Inc
- October 26, 1989: Bactocill in Plastic Container Injectable
  - Applicant: Baxter Healthcare
- March 30, 2012: Oxacillin Sodium Injectable
  - Applicant: Sagent Pharms
- January 18, 2013: Oxacillin Sodium Injectable
  - Applicant: Aurobindo Pharma LTD
- August 25, 2014: Oxacillin Sodium Injectable
  - Applicant: Mylan Labs LTD
- December 11, 2015: Oxacillin Sodium Injectable
  - Applicant: Hospira Inc
- July 31, 2017: Oxacillin Sodium Injectable
  - Applicant: Wockhardt Bio/Ag

=== Pricing ===
The average wholesale price (AWP) for oxacillin products are provided as follows. The prices listed below are intended to serve as reference values and do not represent the pricing determined by any single manufacturer or entity.

- Bactocill in Dextrose Intravenous
  - 1 g/50 mL: $20.37
  - 2 g/50 mL: $32.48
- Oxacillin Sodium Injection
  - 1 g: $17.52
  - 2 g: $33.99
  - 10 g: $138.77
