= Isoxazole =

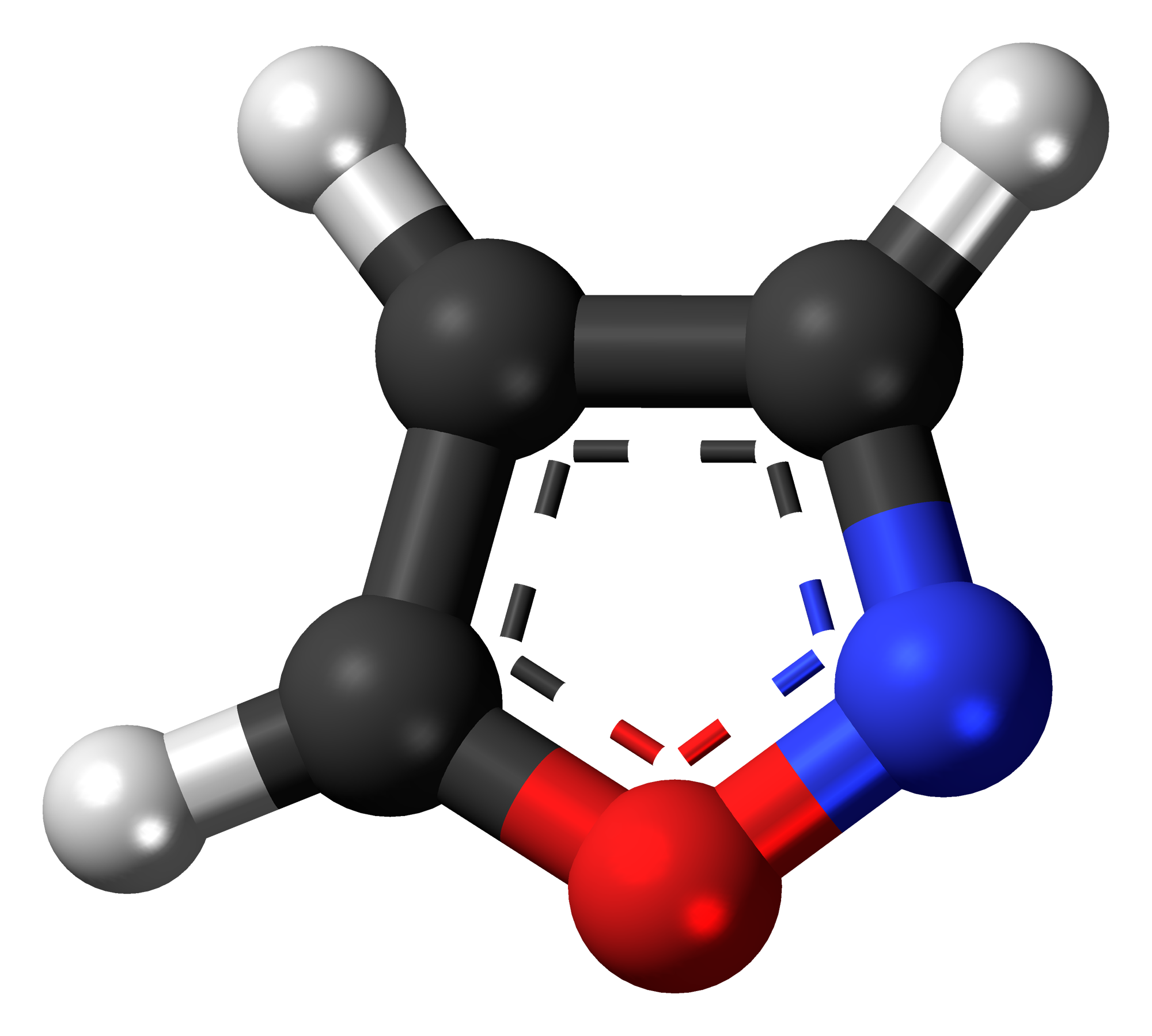

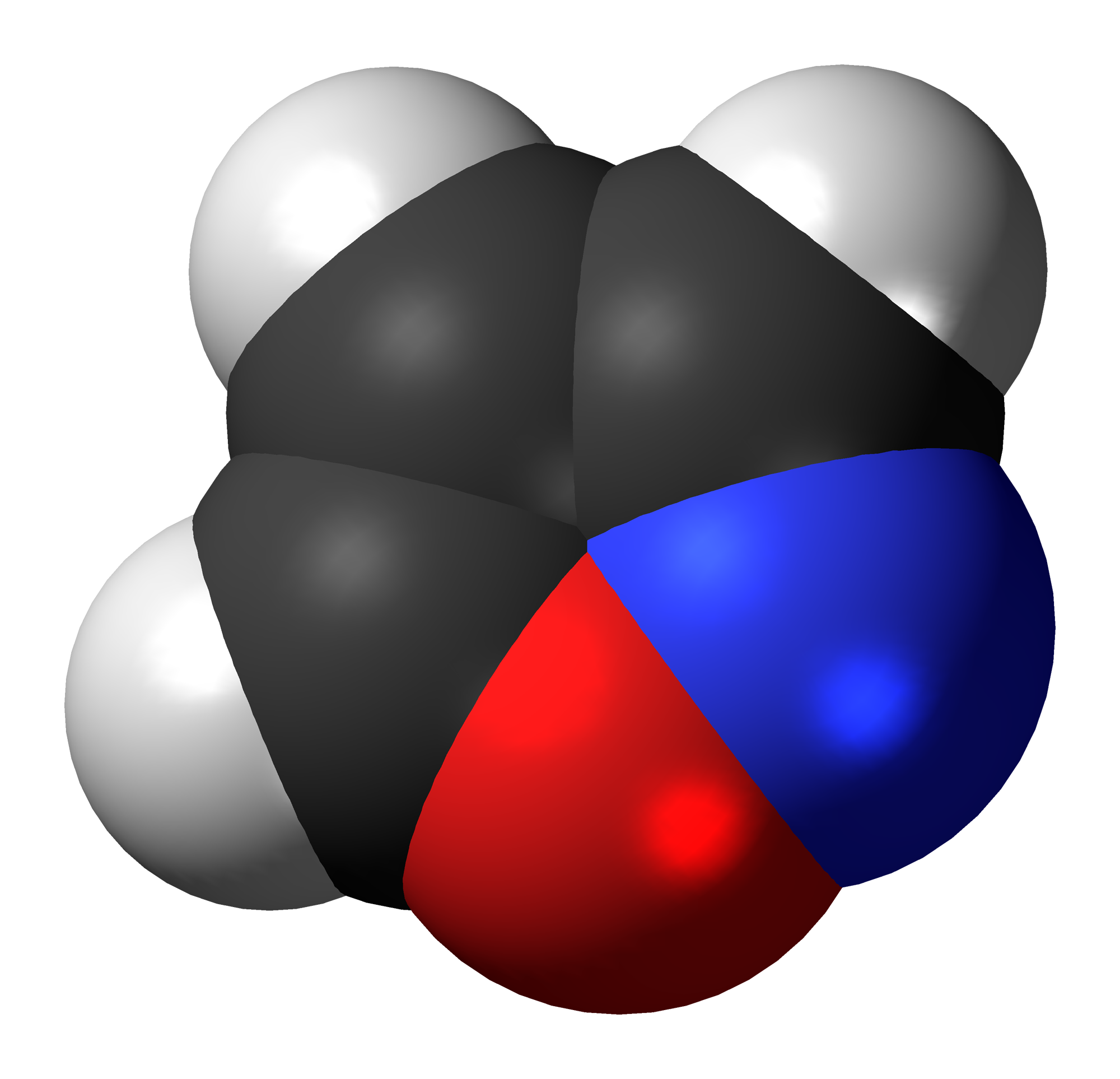

Names
- Preferred IUPAC name 1,2-Oxazole
- Other names isoxazole

Identifiers
CAS Number	288-14-2
3D model (JSmol)	Interactive image
ChEBI	CHEBI:35595
ChEMBL	ChEMBL13257
ChemSpider	8897
ECHA InfoCard	100.005.472
PubChem CID	9254
UNII	00SRW0M6PW
CompTox Dashboard (EPA)	DTXSID7059775
- InChI: InChI=1S/C3H3NO/c1-2-4-5-3-1/h1-3H Key: CTAPFRYPJLPFDF-UHFFFAOYSA-N; InChI=1/C3H3NO/c1-2-4-5-3-1/h1-3H Key: CTAPFRYPJLPFDF-UHFFFAOYAS
- SMILES: n1occc1

Properties
Chemical formula	C_{3}H_{3}NO
Molar mass	69.06202 g/mol
Density	1.075 g/ml
Boiling point	95 °C (203 °F; 368 K)
Acidity (pK_{a})	−3.0 (of conjugate acid)
- Except where otherwise noted, data are given for materials in their standard state (at 25 °C [77 °F], 100 kPa). verify (what is ?) Infobox references

Isoxazole is an electron-rich azole with an oxygen atom next to the nitrogen. It is also the class of compounds containing this ring. Isoxazolyl is the univalent functional group derived from isoxazole.

== Occurrence ==
Isoxazole rings are found in some natural products, such as ibotenic acid and muscimol.

=== Synthesis ===
Isoxazole can be synthesised via a variety of methods. Examples include via a 1,3-dipolar cycloaddition of nitrile oxides with alkynes; or the reaction of hydroxylamine with 1,3-diketones or derivatives of propiolic acid.

=== Photochemistry ===
The photolysis of isoxazole was first reported in 1966. Due to the weak N-O bond, the isoxazole ring tends to collapse under UV irradiation, rearranging to oxazole through azirine intermediate. Meanwhile, the azirine intermediate can react with nucleophiles, especially carboxylic acids. Given the photoreactions, isoxazole group is developed as a native photo-cross-linker for photoaffinity labeling and chemoproteomic studies.

=== Pharmaceuticals and herbicides ===
Isoxazoles also form the basis for a number of drugs, including the COX-2 inhibitor valdecoxib (Bextra) and a neurotransmitter agonist AMPA. A derivative, furoxan, is a nitric oxide donor. An isoxazolyl group is found in many beta-lactamase-resistant antibiotics, such as cloxacillin, dicloxacillin and flucloxacillin. Leflunomide is an isoxazole-derivative drug. Examples of AAS containing the isoxazole ring include danazol and androisoxazole. A number of pesticides are isoxazoles. Gaboxadol is a conformationally constrained isoxazole derivative of muscimol.

Isoxaben is an example of an isoxazole used as a herbicide.

== See also ==
- Oxazole, an analog with the nitrogen atom in position 3
- Pyrrole, an analog without the oxygen atom
- Furan, an analog without the nitrogen atom
- Simple aromatic rings
