= Ampicillin/flucloxacillin =

Combination drug

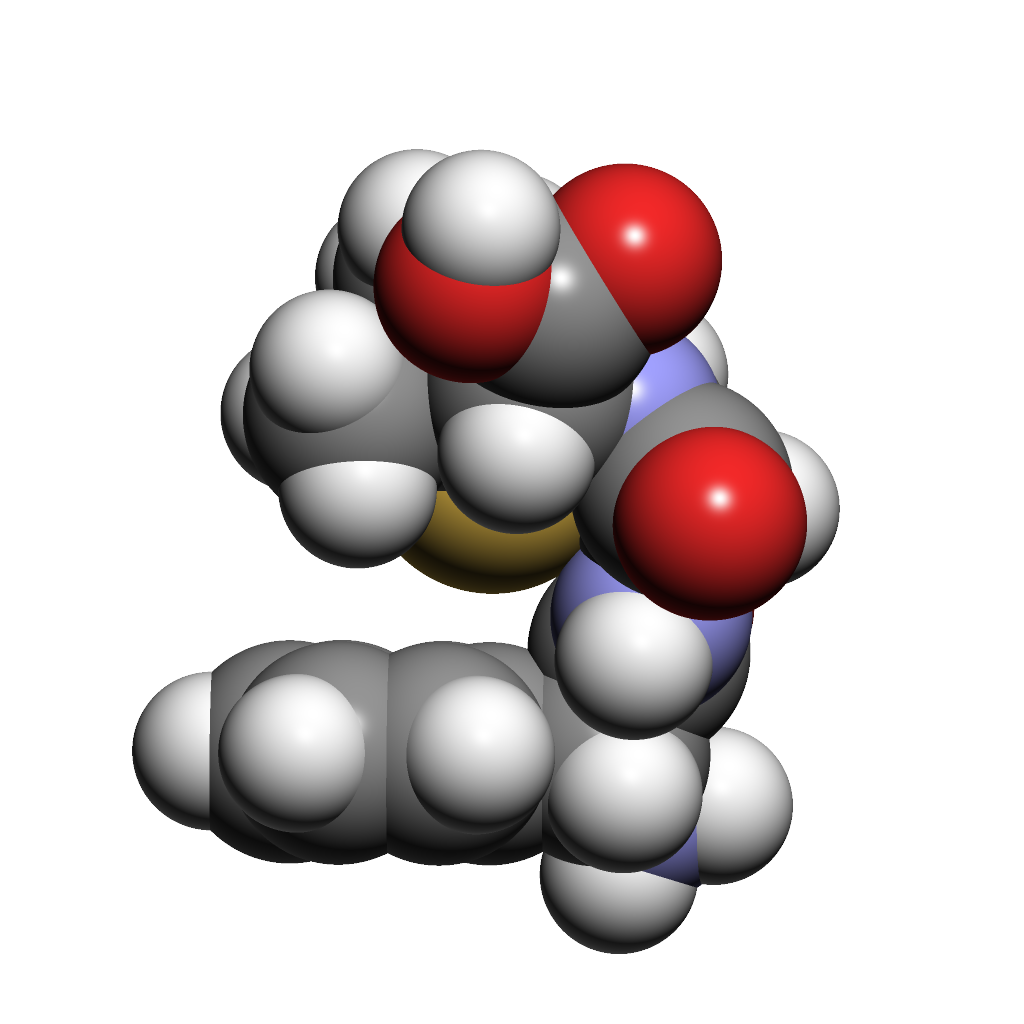

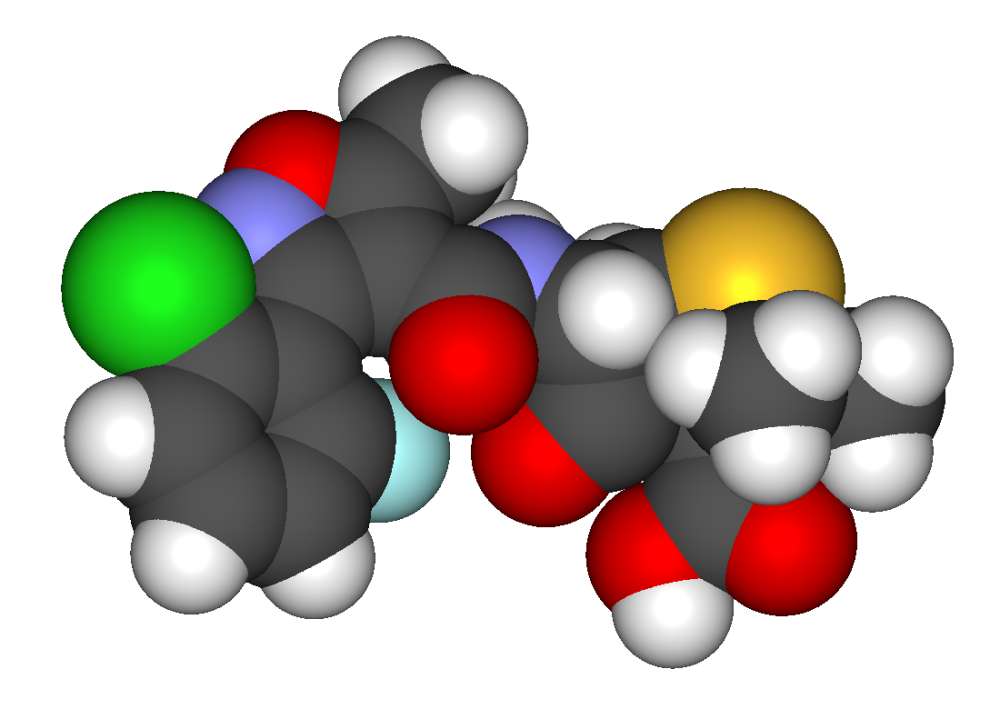

Combination of
- Ampicillin: β-lactam antibiotic (penicillin)
- Flucloxacillin: β-lactam antibiotic (penicillin)

Clinical data
- Routes of administration: Oral, intravenous, intramuscular
- ATC code: J01CR50 (WHO)

Identifiers
- CAS Number: 69-53-4; 5250-39-5
- ChemSpider: 21106281
- UNII: 7C782967RD; 43B2M34G2V
- CompTox Dashboard (EPA): DTXSID90894834

Ampicillin/flucloxacillin (INNs) also known as co-fluampicil (BAN), and sold under the tradename Magnapen, is a combination drug of the two β-lactam antibiotics, ampicillin and flucloxacillin, both in equal amounts, available in a capsule and as a liquid, both taken by mouth, and as a formulation which can be given by injection into muscle or vein.

It is used to treat infections before the laboratory results confirm the causative organism. Side effects include stomach or bowel upsets. It should not be taken by people allergic to penicillin.

== Indication ==
The combination of ampicillin/flucloxacillin is typically given before laboratory results are known. Conditions for which it may be used include infections in the chest, ear, throat, skin and soft tissue. It can be given in septic abortion, puerperal fever and in people receiving immunosuppressive treatments, and to prevent infection after surgery.

== Formulations ==
It is available in a capsule and a liquid, both taken by mouth, and as a formulation which can be given by injection into muscle or vein.

Capsules contain 250 mg of each component, the syrup 125/125 mg per spoon, and the powder for reconstruction for intravenous injection 250/250 mg.

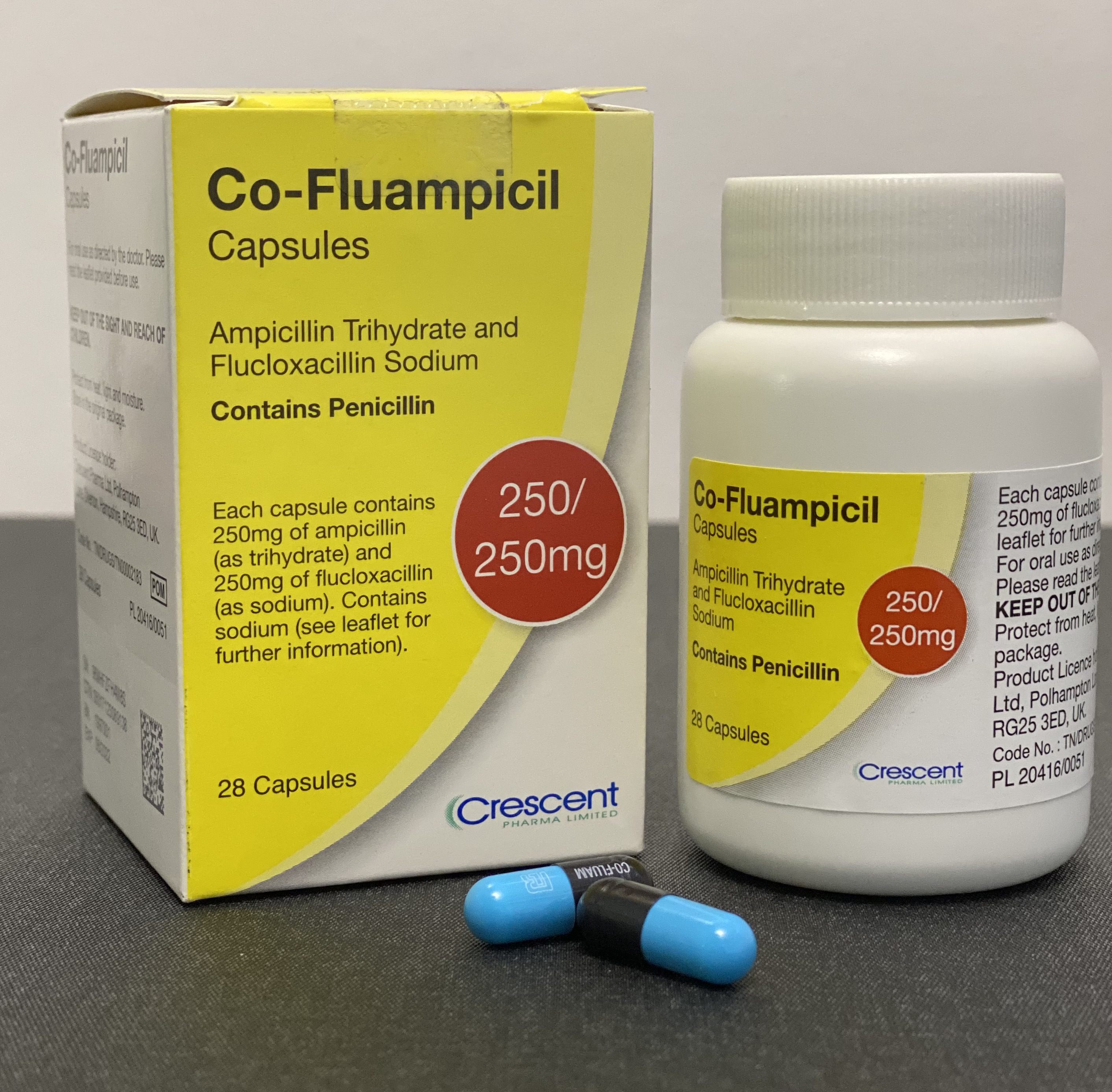
Co-fluampicil capsules and container (UK)

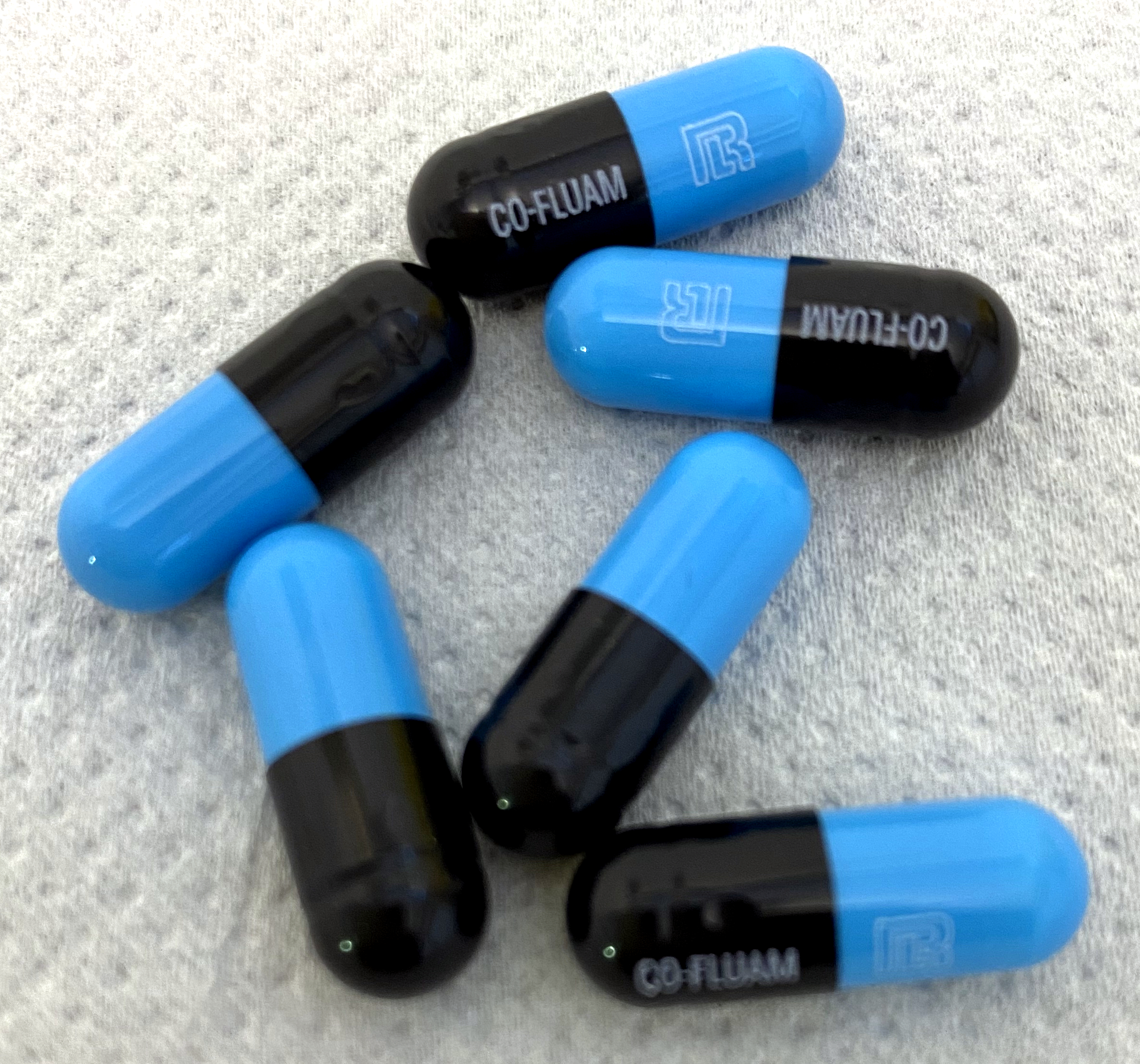
Co-fluampicil capsules (UK)

== Dosage ==
The usual dose by mouth is one capsule of 250 mg 4 times a day in adults and half the adult dose as a syrup for children under the age of 10 years but over 2. For children below the age of 2 years, the oral dose is a quarter of the adult oral dose. Ampicillin/flucloxacillin is taken orally about half an hour before food.

== Side effects and contraindications ==
Side effects are the same as per the individual components, with stomach or bowel upset from the flucloxacillin being the most common. Effects on the kidney or blood count may occur.

Both parts are members of the penicillin family of antibiotics, so should not be taken by people allergic to penicillin. The combination is contraindicated in people with a history of flucloxacillin-associated jaundice/hepatic dysfunction and in people with porphyria.

It is given cautiously to people with glandular fever, cytomegalovirus infection, acute lymphocytic leukaemia or chronic lymphocytic leukaemia; who may have an increased chance of rashes.

== Interactions ==
Interactions may occur with blood thinning medications or allopurinol. Taking the contraceptive pill with ampicillin/flucloxacillin is safe unless vomiting or diarrhoea occurs and persists for more than one day, when extra contraceptive precautions would then be required.

== Pregnancy and breastfeeding ==
It is generally safe in pregnancy. A trace amount in breast milk does not mean in cannot be used in breastfeeding mothers.

== History ==
Ampicillin/flucloxacillin is one of at least 63 β-lactam antibiotics developed in the forty years following the discovery of penicillin.

== See also ==
- Co-amoxiclav
