= Dihydrostreptomycin =

Chemical compound

Clinical data
- AHFS/Drugs.com: International Drug Names
- ATC code: S01AA15 (WHO) QA07AA90 (WHO) QJ01GA90 (WHO) QJ51GA90 (WHO)

Legal status
- Legal status: WIthdrawn

Identifiers
- IUPAC name: 2-[(1S,2R,3R,4S,5R,6R)-5-(Diaminomethylideneamino)-2-[(2R,3R,4R,5S)-3-[(2S,3S,4S,5R,6S)- 4,5-dihydroxy-6-(hydroxymethyl)-3-methylaminooxan-2-yl]oxy-4-hydroxy-4-(hydroxymethyl)- 5-methyloxolan-2-yl]oxy-3,4,6-trihydroxycyclohexyl]guanidine
- CAS Number: 128-46-1
- PubChem CID: 439369
- DrugBank: DB11512
- ChemSpider: 388489
- UNII: P2I6R8W6UA
- ChEMBL: ChEMBL1950576
- CompTox Dashboard (EPA): DTXSID0022937
- ECHA InfoCard: 100.004.445

Chemical and physical data
- Formula: C_{21}H_{41}N_{7}O_{12}
- Molar mass: 583.596 g·mol^{−1}
- 3D model (JSmol): Interactive image
- SMILES: C[C@H]1[C@@]([C@H]([C@@H](O1)O[C@@H]2[C@H]([C@@H]([C@H]([C@@H]([C@H]2O)O)NC(=N)N)O)NC(=N)N)O[C@H]3[C@H]([C@@H]([C@H]([C@@H](O3)CO)O)O)NC)(CO)O
- InChI: InChI=1S/C21H41N7O12/c1-5-21(36,4-30)16(40-17-9(26-2)13(34)10(31)6(3-29)38-17)18(37-5)39-15-8(28-20(24)25)11(32)7(27-19(22)23)12(33)14(15)35/h5-18,26,29-36H,3-4H2,1-2H3,(H4,22,23,27)(H4,24,25,28)/t5-,6-,7+,8-,9-,10-,11+,12-,13-,14+,15+,16-,17-,18-,21+/m0/s1; Key:ASXBYYWOLISCLQ-HZYVHMACSA-N

Dihydrostreptomycin is a semisynthetic aminoglycoside antibiotic with bactericidal properties. It is the dihydro derivative of streptomycin, and was formerly used in the treatment of tuberculosis.

It acts by irreversibly binding the S12 protein in the bacterial 30S ribosomal subunit, after being actively transported across the cell membrane, which interferes with the initiation complex between the mRNA and the bacterial ribosome. This leads to the synthesis of defective, nonfunctional proteins, which results in the bacterial cell's death.

Dihydrostreptomycin is more ototoxic than streptomycin, with a significantly higher risk of causing irreversible hearing loss, since streptomycin primarily affects the vestibular system while dihydrostreptomycin primarily affects the cochlea. This led to it being gradully pulled from the market in 1959, and fully, globally withdrawn from human use in 1970s. It remains a commonly used veterinary drug (usually in combination with penicillin G as an alternative to streptomycin) and agricultural bactericide.
