= Side effects of penicillin =

The side effects of penicillin are bodily responses to penicillin and closely related antibiotics that do not relate directly to its effect on bacteria. A side effect is an effect that is not intended with normal dosing. Some of these reactions are visible and some occur in the body's organs or blood. Penicillins are a widely used group of medications that are effective for the treatment of a wide variety of bacterial infections in human adults and children as well as other species. Some side effects are predictable, of which some are common but not serious, some are uncommon and serious and others are rare. The route of administration of penicillin can have an effect on the development of side effects. An example of this is irritation and inflammation that develops at a peripheral infusion site when penicillin is administered intravenously. In addition, penicillin is available in different forms. There are different penicillin medications (penicillin G benzathine, penicillin G potassium, Penicillin G sodium, penicillin G procaine, and penicillin V) as well as a number of β-lactam antibiotics derived from penicillin (e.g. amoxicillin).

Side effects may only last for a short time and then go away. Side effects can be relieved in some cases with non pharmacological treatment. Some side effects require treatment to correct potentially serious and sometimes fatal reactions to penicillin. Penicillin has not been found to cause birth defects.

== Allergies and cross sensitivities ==
Many people have indicated that they have a side effect related to an allergic reaction to penicillin. It has been proposed that as many as 90% of those claiming to have an allergy to penicillin are able to take it and do not have a true allergy. Research has suggested that having penicillin allergy incorrectly noted in the medical records can have negative consequences, with some reports suggesting fewer than 1% of Americans actually have penicillin allergies.

Identifying an allergy to penicillin requires a hypersensitivity skin test, which diagnoses IgE-mediated immune responses caused by penicillin. This test is typically performed by an allergist who uses a skin-prick and intradermal injection of penicilloyl-polylysine, a negative control (normal saline), and a positive control (histamine).

A small proportion of people who are allergic to penicillins also have similar cross sensitivities to other antibiotics such as cephalosporins. If someone has developed side effects when taking penicillin, these side effects may develop with a new medication even though the person has not taken the new medication before. Those medications that may cause a cross sensitivity reaction are: carbapenems, ampicillin, cefazolin, cephalosporins and cloxacillin.

=== Risk assessment and "de-labelling" ===
Of patients with documented penicillin allergy, approximately 95% will return a negative penicillin skin-prick test but patients carrying a penicillin allergy label are significantly more likely to experience worse outcomes. As such, it is important for clinicians to verify the nature of reported penicillin allergy at admission and de-label when appropriate.

For this purpose, clinical risk assessment tools have been developed such as "PEN-FAST":

- PENicillin allergy reported (start assessment)
- Five years ago or less (2 points)
- Anaphylaxis occurred (2 points)
- Severe cutaneous adverse reaction such as SJS occurred (2 points)
- Treatment was required (1 point)

Patients scoring 4 or greater have a high (50%) probability of testing positive for penicillin allergy.

== Side effects in adults ==
Common adverse drug reactions (≥ 1% of people) associated with use of the penicillins include diarrhea, hypersensitivity, nausea, rash, neurotoxicity, urticaria (hives), and superinfection (including candidiasis). Infrequent adverse effects (0.1–1% of people) include fever, vomiting, erythema, dermatitis, angioedema, seizures (especially in people with epilepsy), and pseudomembranous colitis.

=== Very common (>10% incidence) ===
- diarrhea
- epigastric distress
- nausea
- vomiting
- pseudomembranous colitis
- interstitial nephritis
- rash
- urticaria (hives)
- eosinophilia
- leukopenia (decrease in white blood cells)
- allergic reactions
- superinfection

=== Common (1-10% incidence) ===
- yeast infection
- lack of therapeutic effect
- vaginal itching
- vaginal discharge
- white patches in the mouth and tongue

=== Uncommon (<1%) ===
- wheezing
- fever
- joint pain
- lightheadedness
- fainting
- facial edema (puffiness of the face)
- red, scaly skin
- shortness of breath
- skin rash, hives
- irregular breathing

=== Life threatening ===
- anaphylaxis
- serum sickness
- seizures
- laryngeal edema

=== Rare (<0.1%) ===
- tooth discoloration
- erythema multiforme
- vertigo
- decreased platelet count
- tinnitus
- convulsions
- hypertonia
- cardiac arrest
- cyanosis
- palpitations
- chest pain
- macular rash
- yellow eyes or skin
- stomach or abdominal cramps
- severe abdominal pain
- bloody diarrhea
- depression
- decreased urine excretion
- sore throat
- bleeding or bruising
- agitation
- combativeness
- anxiety
- confusion
- hallucinations

== High doses ==
When penicillin is used at high doses hypokalemia, metabolic acidosis, and hyperkalemia can occur. Developing hypernatremia after administering high doses of penicillin can be a serious side effect.

== Side effects from other medications ==
The side effects of penicillin can be altered by taking other medications at the same time. Taking oral contraceptives along with penicillin may lower the effects of the contraceptive. When probenecid is used concurrently with penicillin, kidney excretion of probenecid is decreased resulting in higher blood levels of penicillin in the circulation. In some instances, this would be an intended therapeutic effect. In other instances, this is an unintended side effect. Neomycin can lower the absorption of penicillin from the gastrointestinal tract resulting in lower than expected levels of penicillin in the circulation. This side effect may result in an ineffective therapeutic effect of penicillin. When methotrexate is administered with penicillin, toxicity may occur related to methotrexate.

== In animals ==
Animals are often treated with antibiotics for infections they have developed. There are side effects of penicillin when it is used in animals. MRSA may develop in pets as a consequence of treatment. Nutritional deficiencies can develop in pets as a side effect. Destruction of the normal protective flora of beneficial bacteria can occur in dogs and horses. Dogs may have side effects that include: joint pain, loss of appetite, vomiting, flatulence (intestinal gas), fungal infections and digestive problems. Like humans, dogs can have a similar side effect related to developing a serious allergy. A serious and possibly fatal anaphylactic can occur. Side effects that are concurrent with anaphylaxis include: breathing problems and shock.

Cats and dogs have had adverse reactions to intravenous penicillin that include: hypothermia, pruritus, hypotension, tremors, seizures, blindness, vocalization, agitation, cardiac arrest and transient loss of vision.

== Other side effects ==
Penicillin is known to become less effective as strains of bacteria become resistant.

== Bibliography ==
- Henry, Norma (2016). RN nursing care of children: review module. Stilwell, KS: Assessment Technologies Institute. ISBN 978-1-56533-571-4.
- Karch, Amy (2017). Focus on nursing pharmacology. Philadelphia: Wolters Kluwer. ISBN 978-1-4963-1821-3.
- Potter, Patricia (2013). Fundamentals of nursing. St. Louis, Mo: Mosby Elsevier. ISBN 978-0-323-07933-4.
- Vallerand, April (2017). Davis's drug guide for nurses. Philadelphia: F.A. Davis Company. ISBN 978-0-8036-5705-2.
