= Cefazolin =

Antibiotic medication

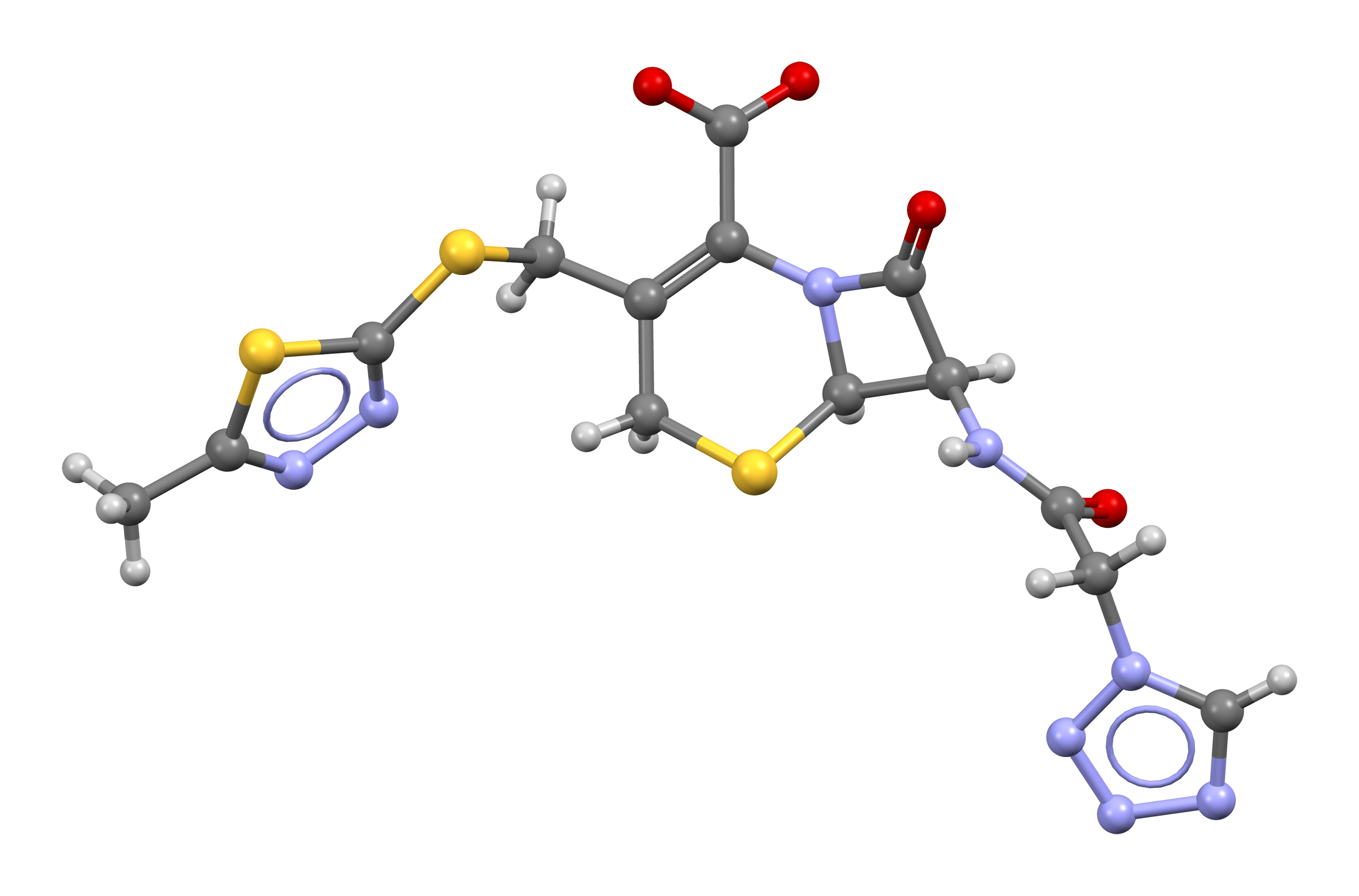

Clinical data
- Pronunciation: /səˈfæzələn/
- Trade names: Ancef, Cefacidal, other
- AHFS/Drugs.com: Monograph
- Pregnancy category: AU: B1
- Routes of administration: intravenous, intramuscular
- Drug class: First-generation cephalosporin
- ATC code: J01DB04 (WHO) QJ51DB04 (WHO)

Legal status
- Legal status: In general: ℞ (Prescription only)

Pharmacokinetic data
- Bioavailability: NA
- Metabolism: ?
- Elimination half-life: 1.8 hours (given IV); 2 hours (given IM)
- Excretion: kidney, unchanged

Identifiers
- IUPAC name: (6R,7R)-3-{[(5-methyl-1,3,4-thiadiazol-2-yl)thio]methyl}-8-oxo-7-[(1H-tetrazol-1-ylacetyl)amino]-5-thia-1-azabicyclo[4.2.0]oct-2-ene-2-carboxylic acid
- CAS Number: 25953-19-9
- PubChem CID: 33255
- DrugBank: DB01327
- ChemSpider: 30723
- UNII: IHS69L0Y4T
- KEGG: D02299
- ChEBI: CHEBI:474053
- ChEMBL: ChEMBL1435
- CompTox Dashboard (EPA): DTXSID2022753
- ECHA InfoCard: 100.043.042

Chemical and physical data
- Formula: C_{14}H_{14}N_{8}O_{4}S_{3}
- Molar mass: 454.50 g·mol^{−1}
- 3D model (JSmol): Interactive image
- Melting point: 198 to 200 °C (388 to 392 °F) (decompose.)
- SMILES: O=C2N1/C(=C(\CS[C@@H]1[C@@H]2NC(=O)Cn3nnnc3)CSc4nnc(s4)C)C(=O)O
- InChI: InChI=1S/C14H14N8O4S3/c1-6-17-18-14(29-6)28-4-7-3-27-12-9(11(24)22(12)10(7)13(25)26)16-8(23)2-21-5-15-19-20-21/h5,9,12H,2-4H2,1H3,(H,16,23)(H,25,26)/t9-,12-/m1/s1; Key:MLYYVTUWGNIJIB-BXKDBHETSA-N

Cefazolin, also known as cefazoline and cephazolin, is a first-generation cephalosporin antibiotic used for the treatment of a number of bacterial infections. Specifically it is used to treat cellulitis, urinary tract infections, pneumonia, endocarditis, joint infection, and biliary tract infections. It is also used to prevent group B streptococcal disease around the time of delivery and before surgery. It is typically given by injection into a muscle or vein.

Common side effects include diarrhea, vomiting, yeast infections, and allergic reactions. Historically, it was thought to be contraindicated in patients with allergies to penicillin, although several recent studies have refuted this and it is proven to be safe in almost all patients, including those with known penicillin allergies. It is relatively safe for use during pregnancy and breastfeeding. Cefazolin is in the first-generation cephalosporin class of medication and works by interfering with the bacteria's cell wall.

Cefazolin was patented in 1967 and came into commercial use in 1971. It is on the World Health Organization's List of Essential Medicines. It is available as a generic medication.

== Medical uses ==
Cefazolin is used in a variety of infections provided that susceptible organisms are involved. It is indicated for use in the following infections:

- Respiratory tract infections
- Urinary tract infections
- Skin infections
- Biliary tract infections
- Bone and joint infections
- Genital infections
- Blood infections (sepsis)
- Endocarditis

It can also be used peri-operatively to prevent infections post-surgery, and is often the preferred drug for surgical prophylaxis.

There is no penetration into the central nervous system and therefore cefazolin is not effective in treating meningitis.

Cefazolin has been shown to be effective in treating methicillin-susceptible Staphylococcus aureus (MSSA) but does not work in cases of methicillin-resistant Staphylococcus aureus (MRSA). In many instances of staphylococcal infections, such as bacteremia, cefazolin is an alternative to penicillin in patients who are allergic to penicillin. However, there is still potential for a reaction to occur with cefazolin and other cephalosporins in patients allergic to penicillin. Resistance to cefazolin is seen in several species of bacteria, such as Mycoplasma and Chlamydia, in which case different generations of cephalosporins may be more effective. Cefazolin does not fight against Enterococcus, anaerobic bacteria, or atypical bacteria, among others.

=== Bacterial susceptibility ===
As a first-generation cephalosporin antibiotic, cefazolin and other first-generation antibiotics are very active against gram-positive bacteria and some gram-negative bacteria. Their broad spectrum of activity can be attributed to their improved stability to many bacterial beta-lactamases compared to penicillins.

=== Spectrum of activity ===
Gram-positive aerobes:

- Staphylococcus aureus (including beta-lactamase producing strains)
- Staphylococcus epidermidis
- Streptococcus pyogenes, Streptococcus agalactiae, Streptococcus pneumoniae and other strains of streptococci

Gram-Negative Aerobes:

- Escherichia coli
- Proteus mirabilis
- Klebsiella pneumoniae

=== Non susceptible ===
The following are not susceptible:

- Methicillin-resistant staphylococcus aureus
- Enterococcus
- most strains of indole positive Proteus (Proteus vulgaris)
- Enterobacter spp.
- Morganella morganii
- Providencia rettgeri
- Serratia spp.
- Pseudomonas spp.
- Listeria

== Special populations ==
=== Pregnancy ===
Cefazolin is pregnancy category B, indicating general safety for use in pregnancy. Caution should be used in breastfeeding as a small amount of cefazolin enters the breast milk. Cefazolin can be used prophylactically against perinatal Group B streptococcal infection (GBS). Although penicillin and ampicillin are the standard of care for GBS prophylaxis, penicillin-allergic women with no history of anaphylaxis can be given cefazolin instead. These patients should be closely monitored as there is a small chance of an allergic reaction due to the similar structure of the antibiotics.

=== Newborns ===
There has been no established safety and effectiveness for use in premature infants and neonates.

=== Elderly ===
No overall differences in safety or effectiveness were observed in clinical trials comparing elderly and younger subjects, however the trials could not eliminate the possibility that some older individuals may have a higher level of sensitivity.

=== Additional considerations ===
People with kidney disease and those on hemodialysis may need the dose adjusted. Cefazolin levels are not significantly affected by liver disease.

As with other antibiotics, cefazolin may interact with other medications being taken. There are some important drugs that may interact with cefazolin such as probenecid.

== Side effects ==
Side effects associated with use of cefazolin therapy include:

- Common (1–10%): diarrhea, stomach pain or upset stomach, vomiting, and rash.
- Uncommon (<1%): dizziness, headache, fatigue, itching, transient hepatitis.

Patients with penicillin allergies could experience a potential reaction to cefazolin and other cephalosporins. As with other antibiotics, patients experiencing watery and/or bloody stools occurring up to three months following therapy should contact their prescriber.

Like those of several other cephalosporins, the chemical structure of cefazolin contains an N-methylthiodiazole (NMTD or 1-MTD) side-chain. As the antibiotic is broken down in the body, it releases free NMTD, which can cause hypoprothrombinemia (likely due to inhibition of the enzyme vitamin K epoxide reductase) and a reaction with ethanol similar to that produced by disulfiram (Antabuse), due to inhibition of aldehyde dehydrogenase. Those with an allergy to penicillin may develop a cross sensitivity to cefazolin.

== Mechanism of action ==
Cefazolin inhibits cell wall biosynthesis by binding penicillin-binding proteins which stops peptidoglycan synthesis. Penicillin-binding proteins are bacterial proteins that help to catalyze the last stages of peptidoglycan synthesis, which is needed to maintain the cell wall. They remove the D-alanine from the precursor of the peptidoglycan. The lack of synthesis causes the bacteria to lyse because they also continually break down their cell walls. Cefazolin is bactericidal, meaning it kills the bacteria rather than inhibiting their growth.

== Cost ==
Cefazolin is relatively inexpensive.

== Trade names ==
It was initially marketed by GlaxoSmithKline under the trade name Nostof.

Other trade names include: Ancef, Cefacidal, Cefamezin, Cefrina, Elzogram, Faxilen, Gramaxin, Kefol, Kefzol, Kefzolan, Kezolin, Novaporin, Reflin, Zinol, and Zolicef.
