= Cloxacillin =

Beta-lactam antibiotic

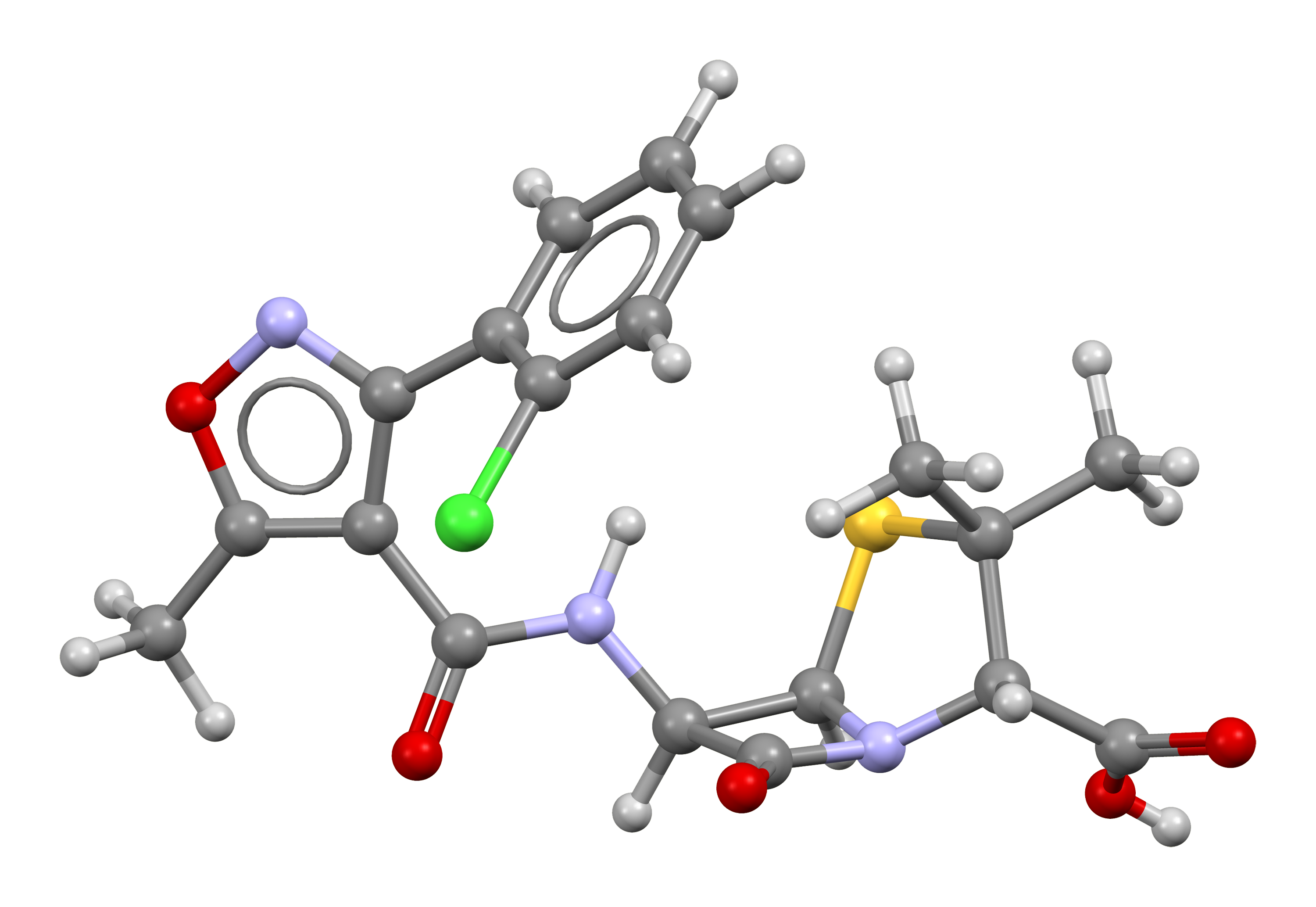

Clinical data
- Trade names: Cloxapen, others
- AHFS/Drugs.com: Micromedex Detailed Consumer Information
- Routes of administration: By mouth, IM
- ATC code: J01CF02 (WHO) QJ51CF02 (WHO) QS01AA90 (WHO)

Pharmacokinetic data
- Bioavailability: 37 to 90%
- Protein binding: 95%
- Elimination half-life: 30 minutes to 1 hour
- Excretion: kidney and biliary

Identifiers
- IUPAC name: (2S,5R,6R)-6-{[3-(2-chlorophenyl)-5-methyl- oxazole-4-carbonyl]amino}-3,3-dimethyl-7-oxo- 4-thia-1-azabicyclo[3.2.0]heptane-2-carboxylic acid or 5 methyl 3(2 chlorophenyl)4 isoxazoyl penicillin
- CAS Number: 61-72-3
- PubChem CID: 6098
- DrugBank: DB01147
- ChemSpider: 5873
- UNII: O6X5QGC2VB
- KEGG: D07733
- ChEBI: CHEBI:49566
- ChEMBL: ChEMBL891
- CompTox Dashboard (EPA): DTXSID5022853
- ECHA InfoCard: 100.000.468

Chemical and physical data
- Formula: C_{19}H_{18}ClN_{3}O_{5}S
- Molar mass: 435.88 g·mol^{−1}
- 3D model (JSmol): Interactive image
- SMILES: O=C(O)[C@@H]3N4C(=O)[C@@H](NC(=O)c2c(onc2c1ccccc1Cl)C)[C@H]4SC3(C)C
- InChI: InChI=1S/C19H18ClN3O5S/c1-8-11(12(22-28-8)9-6-4-5-7-10(9)20)15(24)21-13-16(25)23-14(18(26)27)19(2,3)29-17(13)23/h4-7,13-14,17H,1-3H3,(H,21,24)(H,26,27)/t13-,14+,17-/m1/s1; Key:LQOLIRLGBULYKD-JKIFEVAISA-N

Cloxacillin is an antibiotic useful for the treatment of several bacterial infections. This includes impetigo, cellulitis, pneumonia, septic arthritis, and otitis externa. It is not effective for methicillin-resistant Staphylococcus aureus (MRSA). It can be used by mouth and by injection.

Side effects include nausea, diarrhea, and allergic reactions including anaphylaxis. Clostridioides difficile diarrhea may also occur. It is not recommended in people who have previously had a penicillin allergy. Use during pregnancy appears to be relatively safe. Cloxacillin is in the penicillin family of medications.

Cloxacillin was patented in 1960 and approved for medical use in 1965. It is on the World Health Organization's List of Essential Medicines. It is not commercially available in the United States.

== Mechanism of action ==
It is semisynthetic and in the same class as penicillin. Cloxacillin is used against staphylococci that produce beta-lactamase, due to its large R chain, which does not allow the beta-lactamases to bind. This drug has a weaker antibacterial activity than benzylpenicillin, and is devoid of serious toxicity except for allergic reactions.

== Society and culture ==
Cloxacillin was discovered and developed by Beecham (now GlaxoSmithKline).

It is sold under a number of trade names, including Cloxapen, Cloxacap, Tegopen and Orbenin.

== See also ==
- Dicloxacillin
- Flucloxacillin
- Nafcillin
- Oxacillin
