= ATC code J =

ATC code J Antiinfectives for systemic use is a section of the Anatomical Therapeutic Chemical Classification System, a system of alphanumeric codes developed by the World Health Organization (WHO) for the classification of drugs and other medical products.

Codes for veterinary use (ATCvet codes) can be created by placing the letter Q in front of the human ATC code: for example, QJ. ATCvet codes without corresponding human ATC codes are cited with the leading Q in the following list.
National issues of the ATC classification may include additional codes not present in this list, which follows the WHO version.

== See also ==
- Immune sera, immunoglobulins and vaccines for veterinary use are in the ATCvet group QI.
