= Nafcillin =

Chemical compound

Clinical data
- AHFS/Drugs.com: Monograph
- MedlinePlus: a685019
- Routes of administration: IM, IV
- ATC code: J01CF06 (WHO)

Legal status
- Legal status: In general: ℞ (Prescription only)

Pharmacokinetic data
- Protein binding: 90%
- Metabolism: <30% hepatic
- Elimination half-life: 0.5 hours
- Excretion: Biliary and renal

Identifiers
- IUPAC name: (2S,5R,6R)-6-[(2-ethoxy-1-naphthoyl)amino]-3,3-dimethyl-7-oxo-4-thia-1-azabicyclo[3.2.0]heptane-2-carboxylic acid
- CAS Number: 985-16-0
- PubChem CID: 8982
- DrugBank: DB00607
- ChemSpider: 8634
- UNII: SY07234TTS
- ChEBI: CHEBI:7447
- ChEMBL: ChEMBL1443
- CompTox Dashboard (EPA): DTXSID8023343
- ECHA InfoCard: 100.005.174

Chemical and physical data
- Formula: C_{21}H_{22}N_{2}O_{5}S
- Molar mass: 414.48 g·mol^{−1}
- 3D model (JSmol): Interactive image
- SMILES: O=C(O)[C@@H]3N4C(=O)[C@@H](NC(=O)c2c1ccccc1ccc2OCC)[C@H]4SC3(C)C
- InChI: InChI=1S/C21H22N2O5S/c1-4-28-13-10-9-11-7-5-6-8-12(11)14(13)17(24)22-15-18(25)23-16(20(26)27)21(2,3)29-19(15)23/h5-10,15-16,19H,4H2,1-3H3,(H,22,24)(H,26,27)/t15-,16+,19-/m1/s1; Key:GPXLMGHLHQJAGZ-JTDSTZFVSA-N

Nafcillin sodium is a narrow-spectrum, second-generation beta-lactam antibiotic of the penicillin class. As a beta-lactamase-resistant penicillin, it is used to treat infections caused by Gram-positive bacteria, in particular, species of staphylococci that are resistant to other penicillins.

Nafcillin is considered therapeutically equivalent to oxacillin, although one retrospective study found greater rates of hypokalemia and acute kidney injury in patients taking nafcillin compared to patients taking oxacillin.

== Indications ==
Nafcillin is approved by the FDA for use in treating Staphylococcus infections, including strains resistant to other penicillin-class antibiotics. One notable exception is that Nafcillin is not indicated for treatment of MRSA cases.

U.S. clinical practice guidelines recommend either nafcillin or oxacillin as the first-line treatment of choice for staphylococcal endocarditis in patients without artificial heart valves.

== Side-effects ==
As with all penicillins, serious life-threatening allergic reactions can occur.

Milder side-effects include:

- Hypokalemia
- Nausea and vomiting
- Diarrhea, often due to suppression of normal gastrointestinal bacteria, which, on occasion, leads to a more serious super-infection with an organism like Clostridioides difficile
- Abdominal pain
- Yeast infections (thrush) affecting the mouth and tongue or vagina
- Agranulocytosis, neutropenia

== Interactions ==
There is evidence that nafcillin induces cytochrome P-450 enzymes, specifically CYP2C9. Several drugs with a narrow therapeutic window, such as warfarin and nifedipine, are metabolized by CYP2C9.

Nafcillin contains salts added as stability media. These added salts could cause edema or fluid accumulation. It would be prudent to avoid this medication if there were a concern for a congestive heart failure or kidney disease.

== Mechanism of Action ==
Nafcillin, like other β-lactams, targets bacterial cell wall synthesis during cell growth and division. As a penicillin-class antibiotic, the molecule binds to penicillin binding proteins (PBP) in both the cytoplasm and cytoplasmic membrane. Binding of Nafcillin to PBP's inhibits the proteins' transpeptidase and carboxypeptidase functions, both essential for bacterial cell wall synthesis.

This mechanism is effective against gram-positive bacteria, whose cell walls are composed of thick layers of peptidoglycan, a matrix composed of carbohydrates and amino acids. By inhibiting the synthesis of certain bacterial cell walls, penicillin class drugs, including Nafcillin, make the bacterial cell vulnerable to different osmotic pressures and solutes, killing the cell.
