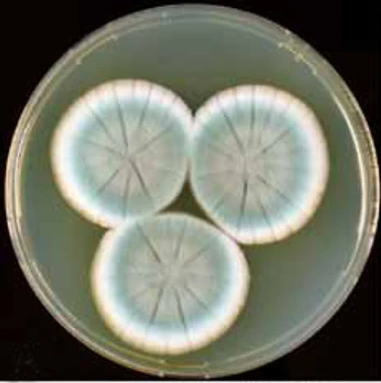

Scientific classification
- Kingdom: Fungi
- Division: Ascomycota
- Class: Eurotiomycetes
- Order: Eurotiales
- Family: Aspergillaceae
- Genus: Penicillium
- Species: P. rubens

Binomial name
- Penicillium rubens Biourge (1910)

= Penicillium rubens =

Species of fungus

Penicillium rubens is a species of fungus in the genus Penicillium and was the first species known to produce the antibiotic penicillin. It was first described by Philibert Melchior Joseph Ehi Biourge in 1923. In 1928, Alexander Fleming at St Mary's Hospital, London discovered that the fungus produced an antibiotic that killed bacteria, and named the unknown compound penicillin. For the discovery and development of penicillin, Fleming shared the 1945 Nobel Prize in Physiology or Medicine with Ernst Boris Chain and Howard Florey.

There was long history of controversy on the exact identification of the original penicillin-producing species and was variously identified as Penicillium rubrum, P. notatum, and P. chrysogenum among others. It was only after genomic comparison and phylogenetic analysis in 2011 that the species was resolved as P. rubens. P. rubens is the best source of penicillins such as benzylpenicillin (G), phenoxymethylpenicillin (V) and octanoylpenicillin (K). It also produces another class of antibiotics, cephalosporins. It is also the source of other important bioactive compounds such as andrastin, chrysogine, fungisporin, roquefortine, and sorbicillins.

== History ==
Belgian microbiologist Philibert Melchior Joseph Ehi Biourge was the first to describe P. rubens in 1923. The medicinal importance was discovered by Alexander Fleming, a physician at St Mary's Hospital, London. In September 1928, Fleming found that one of his bacterial cultures (of Staphylococcus aureus) was contaminated with mould, and that the area around the mould inhibited bacterial growth. He gave the name penicillin for the purported antibacterial substance produced by the mould. After a series of experimental tests, he published his discovery in the June 1929 issue of the British Journal of Experimental Pathology. With the help of his colleague Charles J. La Touche, Fleming identified the fungus as Penicillium rubrum.

But Charles Thom at the U. S. Department of Agriculture, Peoria, Illinois, compared the specimen with his collection of Penicillium species, and corrected the species as P. notatum. In his publication in 1931, he resolved that P. notatum was a member of P. chrysogenum species complex, which he had described in 1910. P. notatum was described by Swedish chemist Richard Westling in 1911. Thom adopted and popularised the use of P. chrysogenum. After discovery of other new species and taxonomic reexamination, three species, P. notatum, P. meleagrinum, and P. cyaneofulvum were recognised as P. chrysogenum. The Seventeenth International Botanical Congress held in Vienna, Austria, in 2005 adopted the name P. chrysogenum as the conserved name (nomen conservandum).

Whole genome sequence and phylogenetic analysis, particularly using β-tubulin sequences, in 2011 showed that P. notatum is P. chrysogenum and that P. rubens, is a different species.

== Biology ==
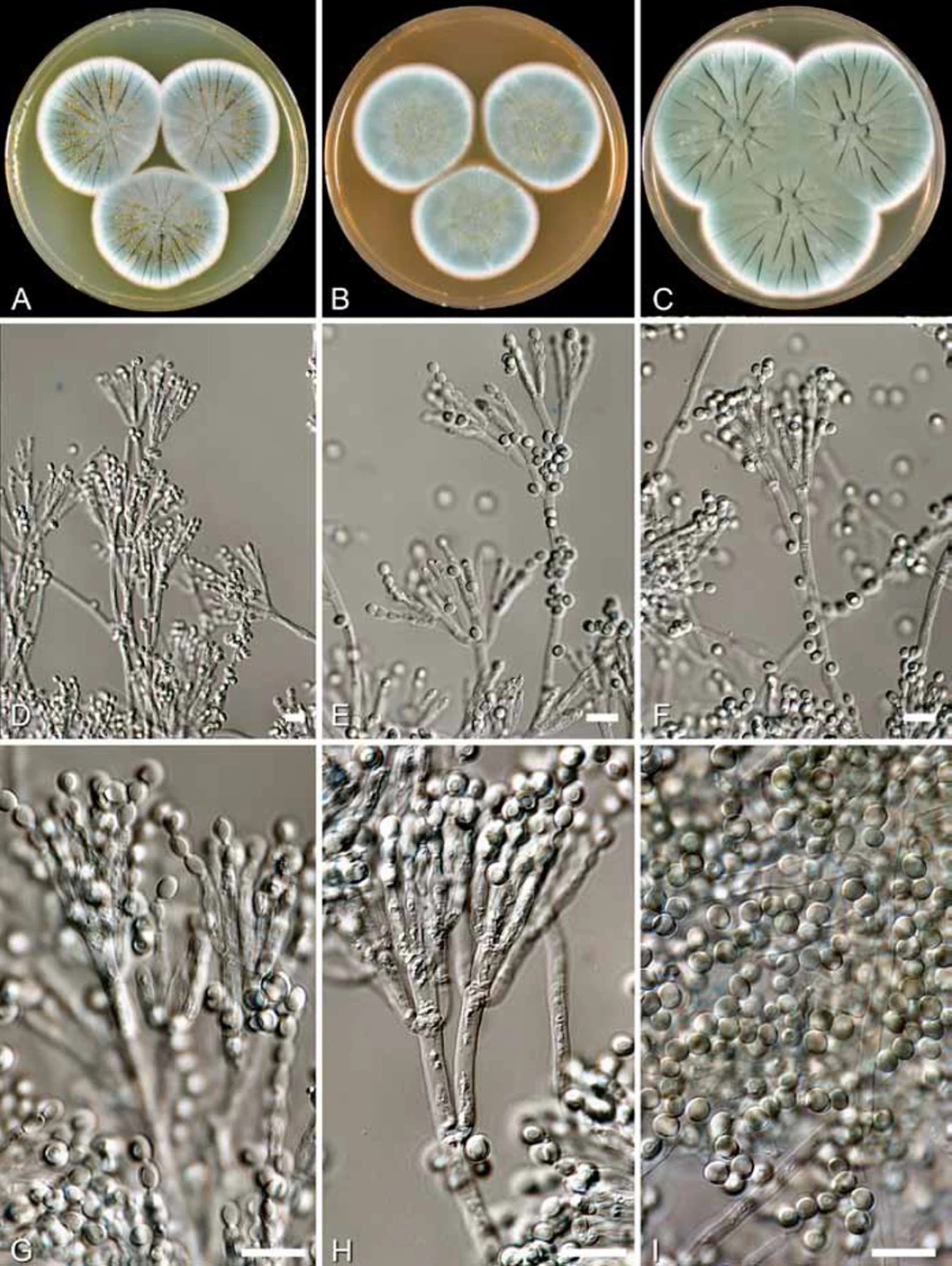
Penicillium rubens (CBS 205.57 = NRRL 824 = IBT 30142), Fleming's original penicillin-producer. A–C. Colonies seven-day-old 25°C. A. Colonies in Czapek yeast extract agar. B. Colonies in malt extract agar. C. Colonies in yeast extract sucrose agar. D–H. Conidiophores. I. Conidia. Bars = 10 μm.

P. rubens is a common fungus of indoor environment. Along with Cladosporium halotolerans and Aspergillus niger, it is one of the nuisance moulds when humidity is high. It is the most resilient mould as it needs less water for growth and propagation. It has a soft and velvety surface. The spore-bearing filaments, conidiophores are smooth and measure 200-300 μm in length. The hairy surface, penicilli are 8-12 μm long. The conidia are smooth-walled, ellipsoidal in shape, measuring 2.5-4.0 μm long, and are blue or bluish-green in colour. It exists in a number of strains, of which the most important are Fleming's strain (designated CBS 205.57 or NRRL 824 or IBT 30142) from which the first penicillin was discovered and the Wisconsin strain (NRRL1951) obtained from a cantaloupe in Peoria, Illinois, in 1944 and has been used for industrial production of penicillin G. The original Wisconsin strain itself has been produced in a variety of strains.

=== Genome ===
P. rubens has four chromosomes. The genome of the Wisconsin strain has been most studied. The nuclear genome of 54-1255 strain, regarded as low-penicillin producer, has a size of 32.19 Mb. There are 13,653 open reading frames (ORFs), including 592 probable pseudogenes and 116 truncated ORFs. Three genes, namely pcbAB, pcbC, and penDE constitute the core sites for penicillin biosynthesis. They are distributed in clusters among other (ORFs) in a 58.8 kb region, on chromosome 2. pcbAB encodes an enzyme α-aminoadipoyl-L-cysteinyl-D-valine synthetase, pcbC encodes isopenicillinN (IPN) synthase, and penDE, encoding acyl-CoA:isopenicillinN acyltransferase. The high penicillin-producing strain, NCPC10086, has slightly larger genome of 32.3 Mb, with about 13,290 protein-coding genes. There are at least 69 genes not present in 54-1255 strain. The gene Pch018g00010 that codes for enzymes in glutathione metabolism is considered as the key factor in enhanced penicillin production of this strain.

The mitochondrial genome consists of 31,790 bp and 17 ORFs. Enzymes of the final biosynthetic pathway such as acyl-CoA:isopenicillinN acyltransferase28 and phenylacetyl-CoA ligase are trafficked to separate cell organelles called microbodies (peroxisomes). The peroxisome gene pex11 is essential for controlling the amount of penicillin synthesis; the more the gene is activated (expressed), the more the penicillins.

== Uses ==
P. rubens is the source of β-lactam antibiotics, principally of penicillins and to a lesser extent, cephalosporins. The species produces three penicillins, benzylpenicillin (G), phenoxymethylpenicillin (V) and octanoylpenicillin (K). Penicillin G is a naturally occurring compound that was first isolated and used as an antibiotic. Penicillins from P. rubens are effective against Gram-positive bacteria such as the species of Bacillus, Clostridium, Corynebacterium, Pneumococcus, Streptococcus, and Staphylococcus. They are clinically used to treat actinomycosis, anthrax, botulism, clostridial infections, diphtheria, empyema, endocarditis, food poisoning (due to Listeria), gas gangrene, meningitis, pneumonia, pericarditis, septicaemia, and syphilis. However, they are useless against Gram-negative bacteria since these bacteria are impermeable to the compounds because of their additional outer cell membrane, as well as some species producing pencillases (β-lactamases) that destroy the penicillin structure (β-lactam ring). However, semisynthetic penicillins like aminopenicillins (ampicillin, amoxicillin, and bacampicillin), carboxypenicillins (carbenicillin and ticarcillin) and ureidopenicillins (mezlocillin, azlocillin, and piperacillin) have been developed that are effective against these bacteria.

Cephalosporins, naturally produced by other fungi belonging to the genus Acremonium, are one of the most widely used antibiotics by clinicians and is also produced by P. rubens. However, they are not naturally produced by P. rubens. Cephalosporins are synthesised from the same biochemical pathway as penicillin biosynthesis, but requires two additional enzymes (such as deacetoxycephalosporin C synthase/hydroxylase and deacetylcephalosporin C acetyltransferase) which are absent in P. rubens. However, P. rubens is genetically engineered to produce the antibiotics by activating the specific genes (cefEF and cefG) that led to the production of the essential enzymes.
