= Extended-spectrum penicillin =

Group of antibiotics that have the widest antibacterial spectrum of all penicillins

The extended-spectrum penicillins are a group of antibiotics that have the widest antibacterial spectrum of all penicillins. Some sources identify them with antipseudomonal penicillins, others consider these types to be distinct. This group includes the carboxypenicillins and the ureidopenicillins. Aminopenicillins, in contrast, do not have activity against Pseudomonas species, as their positively charged amino group does not hinder degradation by bacterially produced beta-lactamases.

== Products ==
- Ureidopenicillins
  - Azlocillin
  - Mezlocillin
  - Piperacillin
- Carboxypenicillins
  - Ticarcillin (generally in the combination ticarcillin/clavulanic acid)
  - Carbenicillin
- Mecillinam

== See also ==
- Pseudomonas aeruginosa § Treatment
