= Bacampicillin =

Chemical compound

Clinical data
- AHFS/Drugs.com: Micromedex Detailed Consumer Information
- Routes of administration: Oral
- Drug class: aminopenicillin
- ATC code: J01CA06 (WHO)

Pharmacokinetic data
- Metabolism: Rapidly hydrolyzed to ampicillin

Identifiers
- IUPAC name: 1-Ethoxycarbonyloxyethyl (2S,5R)-6-[[(2R)-2-amino-2-phenylacetyl]amino]-3,3-dimethyl-7-oxo-4-thia-1-azabicyclo[3.2.0]heptane-2-carboxylate
- CAS Number: 50972-17-3; HCL: 37661-08-8
- PubChem CID: 39849
- DrugBank: DB01602
- ChemSpider: 390135
- UNII: 8GM2J22278; HCL: PM034U953T
- ChEBI: CHEBI:2968
- ChEMBL: ChEMBL1583
- CompTox Dashboard (EPA): DTXSID2048030

Chemical and physical data
- Formula: C_{21}H_{27}N_{3}O_{7}S
- Molar mass: 465.52 g·mol^{−1}
- 3D model (JSmol): HCL: Interactive image
- SMILES: HCL: O=C([C@@H](C(C)(C)S[C@]1([H])[C@@H]2NC([C@H](N)C3=CC=CC=C3)=O)N1C2=O)OC(OC(OCC)=O)C
- InChI: InChI=1S/C21H27N3O7S/c1-5-29-20(28)31-11(2)30-19(27)15-21(3,4)32-18-14(17(26)24(15)18)23-16(25)13(22)12-9-7-6-8-10-12/h6-11,13-15,18H,5,22H2,1-4H3,(H,23,25)/t11?,13-,14-,15+,18-/m1/s1; Key:PFOLLRNADZZWEX-FFGRCDKISA-N

Bacampicillin (INN) is a penicillin antibiotic. It is a prodrug of ampicillin with improved oral bioavailability.

It was sold under the brand names Spectrobid (Pfizer) and Penglobe (AstraZeneca). In 2015, Pfizer discontinued Spectrobid, and no generic manufacturer has taken over production. Bacampicillin is thus unavailable in the United States, and is no longer FDA approved.

== Synthesis ==
Semi-synthetic antibiotic related to penicillin.

The relatively small chemical difference between ampicillin and benzylpenicillin not only allows for substantial oral activity but also results in a substantial broadening of antimicrobial spectrum so as to allow for use against many Gram-negative bacteria. Many devices have been employed in order to enhance still further the oral absorption of ampicillin. Bacampicillin is a prodrug of ampicillin designed for this purpose.

Bacampicillin synthesis:

An azidopenicillin sodium salt (1) is reacted with mixed carbonate ester 2 (itself prepared from acetaldehyde and ethyl chloroformate) to give ester 3. Reduction of the azido linkage with hydrogen and a suitable catalyst produces bacampillin (4). Both enantiomers are active. The drug is rapidly absorbed from the gastrointestinal tract and is quickly cleaved by serum esterases to bioactive ampicillin, acetaldehyde, CO_{2} and ethanol.
