= Penicillin =

Group of antibiotics derived from fungi

- Penicillin core structure, where "R" is the variable group

Clinical data
- AHFS/Drugs.com: Micromedex Detailed Consumer Information
- Routes of administration: Intravenous, intramuscular, by mouth
- ATC code: J01C

Legal status
- Legal status: In general: ℞ (Prescription only)

Pharmacokinetic data
- Metabolism: Liver
- Elimination half-life: Between 0.5 and 56 hours
- Excretion: Kidneys

Penicillins (P, PCN or PEN) are a group of β-lactam antibiotics originally obtained from Penicillium moulds, principally P. chrysogenum and P. rubens. Eight species of Penicillium, in the section Chrysogena, produce penicillins. Most penicillins in clinical use are synthesised by P. chrysogenum using deep tank fermentation and then purified. A number of natural penicillins have been discovered, but only two purified compounds are in clinical use: penicillin G (intramuscular or intravenous use) and penicillin V (given by mouth). Penicillins were among the first medications to be effective against many bacterial infections caused by staphylococci and streptococci. They are still widely used today for various bacterial infections, though many types of bacteria have developed resistance following extensive use.

In the United States, 10% of the population claims penicillin allergies, but because the frequency of positive skin test results decreases by 10% with each year of avoidance, 90% of these patients can eventually tolerate penicillin. Additionally, those with penicillin allergies can usually tolerate cephalosporins (another group of β-lactam) because the immunoglobulin E (IgE) cross-reactivity is only 3%.

Penicillin was discovered in 1928 by the Scottish physician Alexander Fleming as a crude extract of P. rubens. Fleming's student Cecil George Paine was the first to successfully use penicillin to treat eye infection (neonatal conjunctivitis) in 1930. The purified compound (penicillin F) was isolated in 1940 by a research team led by Howard Florey and Ernst Boris Chain at the University of Oxford. Fleming first used the purified penicillin to treat streptococcal meningitis in 1942. The 1945 Nobel Prize in Physiology or Medicine was shared by Chain, Fleming and Florey.

Several semisynthetic penicillins are effective against a broader spectrum of bacteria: these include the antistaphylococcal penicillins, aminopenicillins, and antipseudomonal penicillins.

== Nomenclature ==
The term "penicillin" is defined as the natural product of Penicillium mould with antimicrobial activity. It was coined by Alexander Fleming on 7 March 1929 when he discovered the antibacterial property of Penicillium rubens. Fleming explained in his 1929 paper in the British Journal of Experimental Pathology that "to avoid the repetition of the rather cumbersome phrase 'Mould broth filtrate', the name 'penicillin' will be used". The name thus refers to the scientific name of the mould, as described by Fleming in his Nobel lecture in 1945:

I have been frequently asked why I invented the name "Penicillin". I simply followed perfectly orthodox lines and coined a word which explained that the substance penicillin was derived from a plant of the genus Penicillium just as many years ago the word "Digitalin" was invented for a substance derived from the plant Digitalis.

In modern usage penicillin is used more broadly to refer to any β-lactam antimicrobial that contains a thiazolidine ring fused to the β-lactam core and may or may not be a natural product. Like most natural products, penicillin is present in Penicillium moulds as a mixture of active constituents (gentamicin is another example of a natural product that is an ill-defined mixture of active components). The principal active components of Penicillium are listed in the following table:

Chemical name	UK nomenclature	US nomenclature	Potency relative to penicillin G
2-Pentenylpenicillin	Penicillin I	Penicillin F	70–82%
Benzylpenicillin	Penicillin II	Penicillin G	100%
p-Hydroxybenzylpenicillin	Penicillin III	Penicillin X	130–140%
n-Heptylpenicillin	Penicillin IV	Penicillin K	110–120%

Other minor active components of Penicillium include penicillin O, penicillin U1, and penicillin U6. Other named constituents of natural Penicillium, such as penicillin A, were subsequently found not to have antibiotic activity and are not chemically related to antibiotic penicillins.

The precise constitution of the penicillin extracted depends on the species of Penicillium mould used and on the nutrient media used to culture the mould. Fleming's original strain of Penicillium rubens produces principally penicillin F, named after Fleming. But penicillin F is unstable, difficult to isolate, and produced by the mould in small quantities.

The principal commercial strain of Penicillium chrysogenum (the Peoria strain) produces penicillin G as the principal component when corn steep liquor is used as the culture medium. When phenoxyethanol or phenoxyacetic acid are added to the culture medium, the mould produces penicillin V as the main penicillin instead.

6-Aminopenicillanic acid (6-APA) is a compound derived from penicillin G. 6-APA contains the beta-lactam core of penicillin G, but with the side chains stripped off; 6-APA is a useful precursor for manufacturing other penicillins. There are many semi-synthetic penicillins derived from 6-APA and these are in three groups: antistaphylococcal penicillins, broad-spectrum penicillins, and antipseudomonal penicillins. The semi-synthetic penicillins are all referred to as penicillins because they are all derived ultimately from penicillin G.

=== Penicillin units ===
- One unit of penicillin G sodium is defined as 0.600 micrograms. Therefore, 2 million units (2 megaunits) of penicillin G is 1.2 g.
- One unit of penicillin V potassium is defined as 0.625 micrograms. Therefore 400,000 units of penicillin V is 250 mg.

The use of units to prescribe penicillin is largely obsolete outside of the US. Since the original penicillin was an ill-defined mixture of active compounds (an amorphous yellow powder), the potency of penicillin varied from batch to batch. It was therefore impractical to prescribe 1 g of penicillin because the activity of 1 g of penicillin from one batch would be different from the activity from another batch. To address this problem, after manufacture, each batch of penicillin was standardised against a known unit of penicillin: each glass vial was then filled with the number of units required. In the 1940s, a vial of 5,000 Oxford units was standard, but the depending on the batch, could contain anything from 15 mg to 20 mg of penicillin. Later, a vial of 1,000,000 international units became standard, and this could contain 2.5 g to 3 g of natural penicillin (a mixture of penicillin I, II, III, and IV and natural impurities). With the advent of pure penicillin G preparations (a white crystalline powder), there is little reason to prescribe penicillin in units, although units are still used for benzathine benzylpenicillin in the United States.

The "unit" of penicillin has had three previous definitions, and each definition was chosen as being roughly equivalent to the previous one.

- Oxford or Florey unit (1941). This was originally defined as the minimum amount of penicillin dissolved in 50 ml of meat extract that would inhibit the growth of a standard strain of Staphylococcus aureus (the Oxford Staphylococcus). The reference standard was a large batch of impure penicillin kept in Oxford. The assay was later modified by Florey's group to a more reproducible "cup assay": in this assay, a penicillin solution was defined to contain one unit/ml of penicillin when 339 microlitres of the solution placed in a "cup" on a plate of solid agar produced a 24 millimetre zone of inhibition of growth of Oxford Staphylococcus.
- First International Standard (1944). A single 8 gram batch of pure crystalline penicillin G sodium was stored at The National Institute for Medical Research in Mill Hill, London (the International Standard). One penicillin unit was defined at 0.6 micrograms of the International Standard. An impure "working standard" was also defined and was available in much larger quantities distributed around the world: one unit of the working standard was 2.7 micrograms (the amount per unit was much larger because of the impurities). At the same time, the cup assay was refined, where instead of specifying a zone diameter of 24 mm, the zone size were instead plotted against a reference curve to provide a readout on potency.
- Second International Standard (1953). A single 30 gram batch of pure crystalline penicillin G sodium was obtained: this was also stored at Mill Hill. One penicillin unit was defined as 0.5988 micrograms of the Second International Standard.

There is an older unit for penicillin V that is not equivalent to the current penicillin V unit. The reason is that the US FDA incorrectly assumed that the potency of penicillin V is the same mole-for-mole as penicillin G. In fact, penicillin V is less potent than penicillin G, and the current penicillin V unit reflects that fact.

- First international unit of penicillin V (1959). One unit of penicillin V was defined as 0.590 micrograms of a reference standard held at Mill Hill in London. This unit is now obsolete.

A similar standard was also established for penicillin K.

== Types ==
Penicillins consist of a distinct 4-membered beta-lactam ring, in addition to a thiazolide ring and an R side chain. The main distinguishing feature between variants within this family is the R substituent.

This side chain is connected to the 6-aminopenicillanic acid residue and results in variations in the antimicrobial spectrum, stability and susceptibility to beta-lactamases of each type.

=== Natural penicillins ===
Penicillin G (benzylpenicillin) was first produced from a penicillium fungus that occurs in nature. The strain of fungus used today for the manufacture of penicillin G was created by genetic engineering to improve the yield in the manufacturing process. None of the other natural penicillins (F, K, N, X, O, U1 or U6) are currently in clinical use.

=== Semi-synthetic penicillin ===
Penicillin V (phenoxymethylpenicillin) is produced by adding the precursor phenoxyacetic acid to the medium in which a genetically modified strain of the penicillium fungus is being cultured.

=== Antibiotics created from 6-APA ===
There are three major groups of other semi-synthetic antibiotics related to the penicillins. They are synthesised by adding various side-chains to the precursor 6-APA, which is isolated from penicillin G. These are the antistaphylococcal antibiotics, broad-spectrum antibiotics and antipseudomonal antibiotics.

==== Antistaphylococcal antibiotics ====
- Cloxacillin (by mouth or by injection)
- Dicloxacillin (by mouth or by injection)
- Flucloxacillin (by mouth or by injection)
- Methicillin (injection only)
- Nafcillin (injection only)
- Oxacillin (by mouth or by injection)

Antistaphylococcal antibiotics are so-called because they are resistant to being broken down by staphylococcal penicillinase. They are also, therefore, referred to as being penicillinase-resistant.

==== Broad-spectrum antibiotics ====
This group of antibiotics is called "broad-spectrum" because they are active against a wide range of Gram-negative bacteria such as Escherichia coli and Salmonella typhi, for which penicillin is not suitable. However, resistance in these organisms is now common.

- Ampicillin
- Amoxicillin

There are many ampicillin precursors in existence. These are inactive compounds that are broken down in the gut to release ampicillin. None of these pro-drugs of ampicillin is in current use:

- Pivampicillin (pivaloyloxymethyl ester of ampicillin)
- Bacampicillin
- Metampicillin (formaldehyde ester of ampicillin)
- Talampicillin
- Hetacillin (ampicillin conjugated to acetone)

Epicillin is an aminopenicillin that has never seen widespread clinical use.

==== Antipseudomonal antibiotics ====
The Gram-negative species, Pseudomonas aeruginosa, is naturally resistant to many antibiotic classes. There were many efforts in the 1960s and 1970s to develop antibiotics that are active against Pseudomonas species. There are two chemical classes within the group: carboxypenicillins and ureidopenicillins. All are given by injection: none can be given by mouth.

===== Carboxypenicillins =====
- Carbenicillin
- Ticarcillin
- Temocillin

===== Ureidopenicillins =====
- Mezlocillin
- Piperacillin
- Azlocillin

=== β-lactamase inhibitors ===
- Clavulanic acid
- Sulbactam
- Tazobactam

== Medical usage ==
The term "penicillin", when used by itself, may refer to either of two chemical compounds, penicillin G or penicillin V.

Common name	Chemical name	Method of administration
Penicillin V	phenoxymethylpenicillin	oral
Penicillin G	benzylpenicillin	intravenous intramuscular

=== Penicillin G ===
Penicillin G is destroyed by stomach acid, so it cannot be taken by mouth, but doses as high as 2.4 g can be given (much higher than penicillin V). It is given by intravenous or intramuscular injection. It can be formulated as an insoluble salt, and there are two such formulations in current use: procaine penicillin and benzathine benzylpenicillin. When a high concentration in the blood must be maintained, penicillin G must be administered at relatively frequent intervals, because it is eliminated quite rapidly from the bloodstream by the kidney.

Penicillin G is licensed for use to treat septicaemia, empyema, pneumonia, pericarditis, endocarditis and meningitis caused by susceptible strains of staphylococci and streptococci. It is also licensed for the treatment of anthrax, actinomycosis, cervicofacial disease, thoracic and abdominal disease, clostridial infections, botulism, gas gangrene (with accompanying debridement and/or surgery as indicated), tetanus (as an adjunctive therapy to human tetanus immune globulin), diphtheria (as an adjunctive therapy to antitoxin and for the prevention of the carrier state), erysipelothrix endocarditis, fusospirochetosis (severe infections of the oropharynx, lower respiratory tract and genital area), Listeria infections, meningitis, endocarditis, Pasteurella infections including bacteraemia and meningitis, Haverhill fever; rat-bite fever and disseminated gonococcal infections, meningococcal meningitis and/or septicaemia caused by penicillin-susceptible organisms and syphilis.

=== Penicillin V ===
Penicillin V can be taken by mouth because it is relatively resistant to stomach acid. Doses higher than 500 mg are not fully effective because of poor absorption. It is used for the same bacterial infections as those of penicillin G and is the most widely used form of penicillin. However, it is not used for diseases, such as endocarditis, where high blood levels of penicillin are required.

=== Bacterial susceptibility ===
Because penicillin resistance is now so common, other antibiotics are now the preferred choice for treatments. For example, penicillin used to be the first-line treatment for infections with Neisseria gonorrhoeae and Neisseria meningitidis, but it is no longer recommended for treatment of these infections. Penicillin resistance is now very common in Staphylococcus aureus, which means penicillin should not be used to treat infections caused by S. aureus infection unless the infecting strain is known to be susceptible.

Bacterium	Susceptible (S)	Intermediate (I)	Resistant (R)
Staphylococcus aureus	≤0.12 mcg/ml	-	≥0.25 mcg/ml
Streptococcus pneumoniae meningitis	≤0.06 mcg/ml	-	≥0.12 mcg/ml
Streptococcus pneumoniae (not meningitis)	≤2 mcg/ml		≥8 mcg/ml
Streptococcus Viridans group	0.12 mcg/ml	0.25–2 mcg/ml	4 mcg/ml
Listeria monocytogenes	≤2 mcg/ml	-	-
Bacillus anthracis	≤0.12 mcg/ml	-	≥0.25 mcg/ml

== Side effects ==
Common (≥ 1% of people) adverse drug reactions associated with use of the penicillins include diarrhoea, hypersensitivity, nausea, rash, neurotoxicity, urticaria, and superinfection (including candidiasis). Infrequent adverse effects (0.1–1% of people) include fever, vomiting, erythema, dermatitis, angioedema, seizures (especially in people with epilepsy), and pseudomembranous colitis. Penicillin can also induce serum sickness or a serum sickness-like reaction in some individuals. Serum sickness is a type III hypersensitivity reaction that occurs one to three weeks after exposure to drugs including penicillin. It is not a true drug allergy, because allergies are type I hypersensitivity reactions, but repeated exposure to the offending agent can result in an anaphylactic reaction. Allergy will occur in 1–10% of people, presenting as a skin rash after exposure. IgE-mediated anaphylaxis will occur in approximately 0.01% of patients.

Pain and inflammation at the injection site are also common for parenterally administered benzathine benzylpenicillin, benzylpenicillin, and, to a lesser extent, procaine benzylpenicillin. The condition is known as livedoid dermatitis or Nicolau syndrome.

== Structure ==
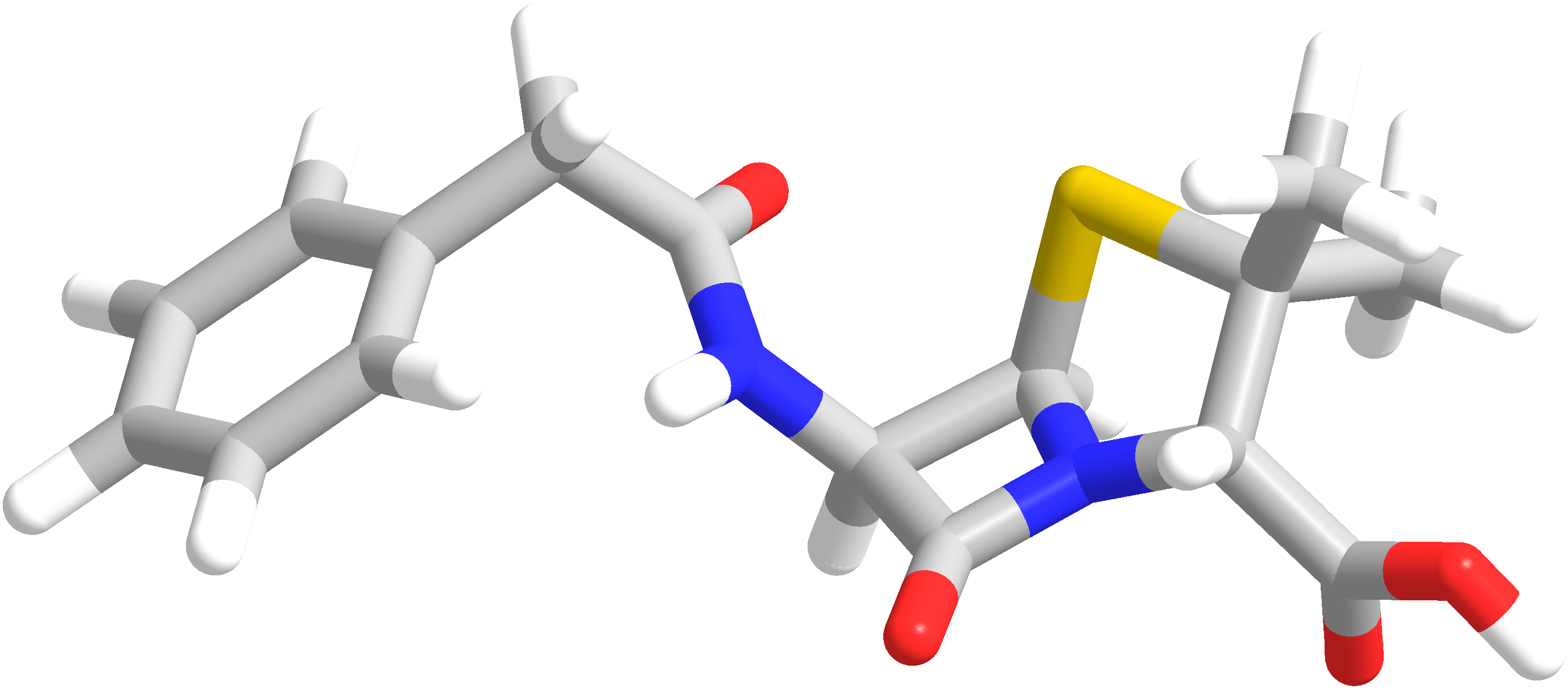
Chemical structure of Penicillin G. The sulfur and nitrogen of the five-membered thiazolidine ring are shown in yellow and blue respectively. The image shows that the thiazolidine ring and fused four-membered β-lactam are not in the same plane.

The term "penam" is used to describe the common core skeleton of a member of the penicillins. This core has the molecular formula R-C_{9}H_{11}N_{2}O_{4}S, where R is the variable side chain that differentiates the penicillins from one another. The penam core has a molar mass of 243 g/mol, with larger penicillins having molar mass near 450—for example, cloxacillin has a molar mass of 436 g/mol. 6-APA (C_{8}H_{12}N_{2}O_{3}S) forms the basic structure of penicillins. It is made up of an enclosed dipeptide formed by the condensation of L-cysteine and D-valine. This results in the formations of β-lactam and thiazolidinic rings.

The key structural feature of the penicillins is the four-membered β-lactam ring; this structural moiety is essential for penicillin's antibacterial activity. The β-lactam ring is itself fused to a five-membered thiazolidine ring. The fusion of these two rings causes the β-lactam ring to be more reactive than monocyclic β-lactams because the two fused rings distort the β-lactam amide bond and therefore remove the resonance stabilisation normally found in these chemical bonds. An acyl side side chain attached to the β-lactam ring.

A variety of β-lactam antibiotics have been produced following chemical modification from the 6-APA structure during synthesis, specifically by making chemical substitutions in the acyl side chain. For example, the first chemically altered penicillin, methicillin, had substitutions by methoxy groups at positions 2' and 6' of the 6-APA benzene ring from penicillin G. This difference makes methicillin resistant to the activity of β-lactamase, an enzyme by which many bacteria are naturally unsusceptible to penicillins.

== Pharmacology ==
=== Entry into bacteria ===
Penicillin can easily enter bacterial cells in the case of gram-positive species. This is because Gram-positive bacteria do not have an outer cell membrane and are simply enclosed in a thick cell wall. Penicillin molecules are small enough to pass through the spaces of glycoproteins in the cell wall. For this reason Gram-positive bacteria are very susceptible to penicillin (as first evidenced by the discovery of penicillin in 1928).

Penicillin, or any other molecule, enters gram-negative bacteria in a different manner. The bacteria have thinner cell walls but the external surface is coated with an additional cell membrane, called the outer membrane. The outer membrane is a lipid layer (lipopolysaccharide chain) that blocks passage of water-soluble (hydrophilic) molecules like penicillin. It thus acts as the first line of defence against any toxic substance, which is the reason for relative resistance to antibiotics compared to gram-positive species. But penicillin can still enter gram-negative species by diffusing through aqueous channels called porins (outer membrane proteins), which are dispersed among the fatty molecules and can transport nutrients and antibiotics into the bacteria. Porins are large enough to allow diffusion of most penicillins, but the rate of diffusion through them is determined by the specific size of the drug molecules. For instance, penicillin G is large and enters through porins slowly; while smaller ampicillin and amoxicillin diffuse much faster. In contrast, large vancomycin can not pass through porins and is thus ineffective for gram-negative bacteria. The size and number of porins are different in different bacteria. As a result of the two factors—size of penicillin and porin—gram-negative bacteria can be unsusceptible or have varying degree of susceptibility to specific penicillin.

=== Mechanism of action ===
Gram-negative bacteria that attempt to grow and divide in the presence of penicillin fail to do so, and instead end up shedding their cell walls.

Penicillin and other β-lactam antibiotics act by inhibiting penicillin-binding proteins, which normally catalyse cross-linking of bacterial cell walls.

Penicillin kills bacteria by inhibiting the completion of the synthesis of peptidoglycans, the structural component of the bacterial cell wall. It specifically inhibits the activity of enzymes that are needed for the cross-linking of peptidoglycans during the final step in cell wall biosynthesis. It does this by binding to penicillin binding proteins with the β-lactam ring, a structure found on penicillin molecules. This causes the cell wall to weaken due to fewer cross-links and means water uncontrollably flows into the cell because it cannot maintain the correct osmotic gradient. This results in cell lysis and death.

Bacteria constantly remodel their peptidoglycan cell walls, simultaneously building and breaking down portions of the cell wall as they grow and divide. During the last stages of peptidoglycan biosynthesis, uridine diphosphate-N-acetylmuramic acid pentapeptide (UDP-MurNAc) is formed in which the fourth and fifth amino acids are both D-alanyl-D-alanine. The transfer of D-alanine is done (catalysed) by the enzyme DD-transpeptidase (penicillin-binding proteins are such type). The structural integrity of bacterial cell wall depends on the cross linking of UDP-MurNAc and N-acetyl glucosamine. Penicillin and other β-lactam antibiotics act as an analogue of D-alanine-D-alanine (the dipeptide) in UDP-MurNAc owing to conformational similarities. The DD-transpeptidase then binds the four-membered β-lactam ring of penicillin instead of UDP-MurNAc. As a consequence, DD-transpeptidase is inactivated, the formation of cross-links between UDP-MurNAc and N-acetyl glucosamine is blocked so that an imbalance between cell wall production and degradation develops, causing the cell to rapidly die.

The enzymes that hydrolyse the peptidoglycan cross-links continue to function, even while those that form such cross-links do not. This weakens the cell wall of the bacterium, and osmotic pressure becomes increasingly uncompensated—eventually causing cell death (cytolysis). In addition, the build-up of peptidoglycan precursors triggers the activation of bacterial cell wall hydrolases and autolysins, which further digest the cell wall's peptidoglycans. The small size of the penicillins increases their potency, by allowing them to penetrate the entire depth of the cell wall. This is in contrast to the glycopeptide antibiotics vancomycin and teicoplanin, which are both much larger than the penicillins.

Gram-positive bacteria are called protoplasts when they lose their cell walls. Gram-negative bacteria do not lose their cell walls completely and are called spheroplasts after treatment with penicillin.

Penicillin shows a synergistic effect with aminoglycosides, since the inhibition of peptidoglycan synthesis allows aminoglycosides to penetrate the bacterial cell wall more easily, allowing their disruption of bacterial protein synthesis within the cell. This results in a lowered MBC for susceptible organisms.

Penicillins, like other β-lactam antibiotics, block not only the division of bacteria, including cyanobacteria, but also the division of cyanelles, the photosynthetic organelles of the glaucophytes, and the division of chloroplasts of bryophytes. In contrast, they have no effect on the plastids of the highly developed vascular plants. This supports the endosymbiotic theory of the evolution of plastid division in land plants.

Some bacteria produce enzymes that break down the β-lactam ring, called β-lactamases, which make the bacteria resistant to penicillin. Therefore, some penicillins are modified or given with other drugs for use against antibiotic-resistant bacteria or in immunocompromised patients. The use of clavulanic acid or tazobactam, β-lactamase inhibitors, alongside penicillin gives penicillin activity against β-lactamase-producing bacteria. β-Lactamase inhibitors irreversibly bind to β-lactamase preventing it from breaking down the beta-lactam rings on the antibiotic molecule. Alternatively, flucloxacillin is a modified penicillin that has activity against β-lactamase-producing bacteria due to an acyl side chain that protects the beta-lactam ring from β-lactamase.

=== Pharmacokinetics ===
Penicillin has low protein binding in plasma. The bioavailability of penicillin depends on the type: penicillin G has low bioavailability, below 30%, whereas penicillin V has higher bioavailability, between 60 and 70%.

Penicillin has a short half-life and is excreted via the kidneys. This means it must be dosed at least four times a day to maintain adequate levels of penicillin in the blood. Early manuals on the use of penicillin, therefore, recommended injections of penicillin as frequently as every three hours, and dosing penicillin has been described as being similar to trying to fill a bath with the plug out. This is no longer required since much larger doses of penicillin are cheaply and easily available; however, some authorities recommend the use of continuous penicillin infusions for this reason.

== Resistance ==
When Alexander Fleming discovered the crude penicillin in 1928, one important observation he made was that many bacteria were not affected by penicillin. This phenomenon was realised by Ernst Chain and Edward Abraham while trying to identify the exact mechanism of penicillin. In 1940, they discovered that unsusceptible bacteria like Escherichia coli produced specific enzymes that can break down penicillin molecules, thus making them resistant to the antibiotic. They named the enzyme penicillinase. Penicillinase is now classified as member of enzymes called β-lactamases. These β-lactamases are naturally present in many other bacteria, and many bacteria produce them upon constant exposure to antibiotics. In most bacteria, resistance can be through three different mechanisms – reduced permeability in bacteria, reduced binding affinity of the penicillin-binding proteins (PBPs) or destruction of the antibiotic through the expression of β-lactamase. Using any of these, bacteria commonly develop resistance to different antibiotics, a phenomenon called multi-drug resistance.

The actual process of resistance mechanism can be very complex. In case of reduced permeability in bacteria, the mechanisms are different between gram-positive and gram-negative bacteria. In gram-positive bacteria, blockage of penicillin is due to changes in the cell wall. For example, resistance to vancomycin in S. aureus is due to additional peptidoglycan synthesis that makes the cell wall much thicker preventing effective penicillin entry. Resistance in gram-negative bacteria is due to mutational variations in the structure and number of porins. In bacteria like Pseudomonas aeruginosa, there is reduced number of porins; whereas in bacteria like Enterobacter species, Escherichia coli and Klebsiella pneumoniae, there are modified porins such as non-specific porins (such as OmpC and OmpF groups) that cannot transport penicillin.

Resistance due to PBP alterations is highly varied. A common case is found in Streptococcus pneumoniae where there is mutation in the gene for PBP, and the mutant PBPs have decreased binding affinity for penicillins. There are six mutant PBPs in S. pneumoniae, of which PBP1a, PBP2b, PBP2x and sometimes PBP2a are responsible for reduced binding affinity. S. aureus can activate a hidden gene that produces a different PBP, PBD2, which has low binding affinity for penicillins. There is a different strain of S. aureus named methicillin-resistant S. aureus (MRSA) which is resistant not only to penicillin and other β-lactams, but also to most antibiotics. The bacterial strain developed after introduction of methicillin in 1959. In MRSA, mutations in the genes (mec system) for PBP produce a variant protein called PBP2a (also termed PBP2'), while making four normal PBPs. PBP2a has poor binding affinity for penicillin and also lacks glycosyltransferase activity required for complete peptidoglycan synthesis (which is carried out by the four normal PBPs). In Helicobacter cinaedi, there are multiple mutations in different genes that make PBP variants.

Enzymatic destruction by β-lactamases is the most important mechanism of penicillin resistance, and is described as "the greatest threat to the usage [of penicillins]". It was the first discovered mechanism of penicillin resistance. During the experiments when purification and biological activity tests of penicillin were performed in 1940, it was found that E. coli was unsusceptible. The reason was discovered as production of an enzyme penicillinase (hence, the first β-lactamase known) in E. coli that easily degraded penicillin. There are over 2,000 types of β-lactamases each of which has unique amino acid sequence, and thus, enzymatic activity. All of them are able to hydrolyse β-lactam rings but their exact target sites are different. They are secreted on the bacterial surface in large quantities in gram-positive bacteria but less so in gram-negative species. Therefore, in a mixed bacterial infection, the gram-positive bacteria can protect the otherwise penicillin-susceptible gram-negative cells.

There are unusual mechanisms in P. aeruginosa, in which there can be biofilm-mediated resistance and formation of multidrug-tolerant persister cells.

== History ==
=== Discovery ===
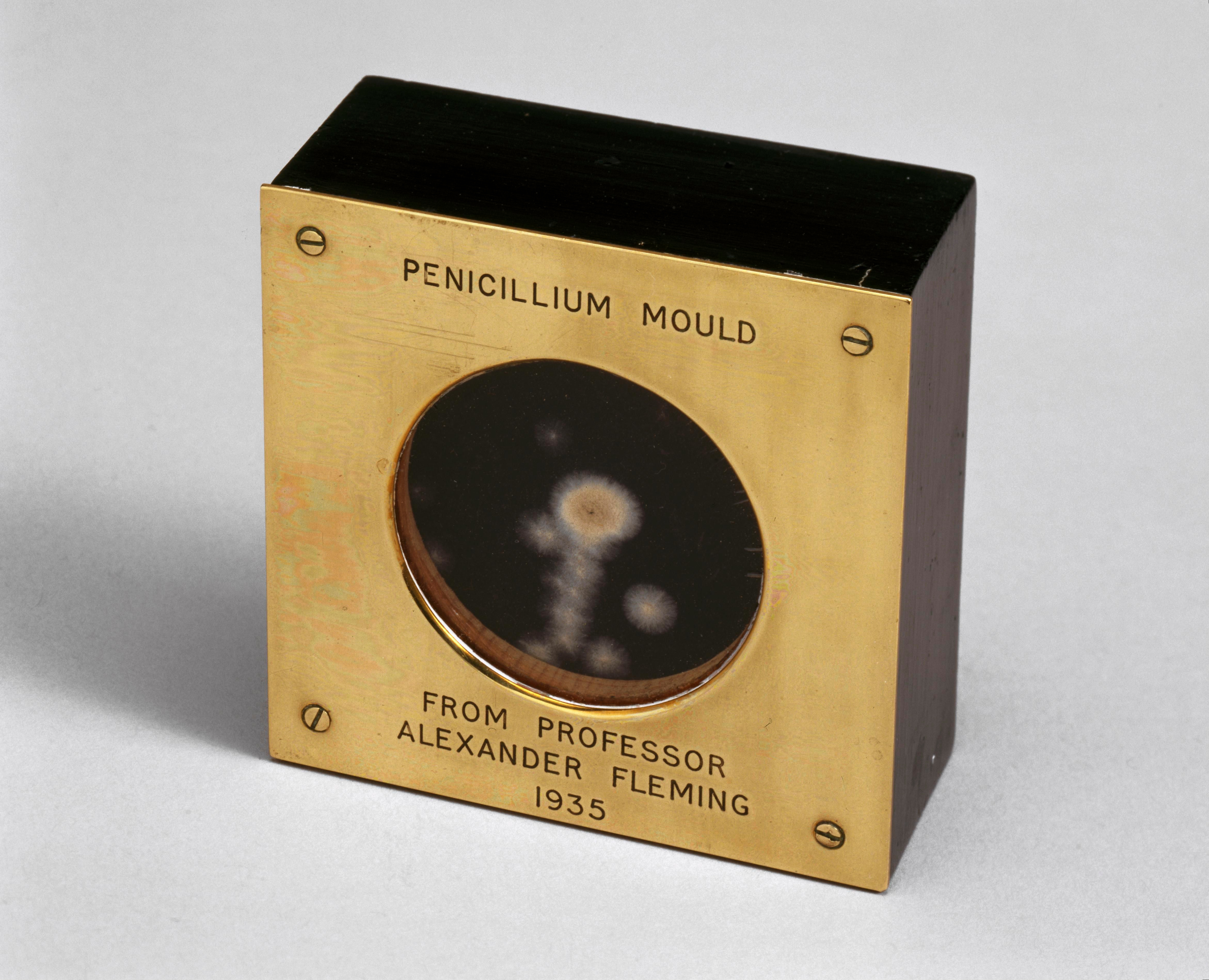
Sample of penicillium mould presented by Alexander Fleming to Douglas Macleod, 1935

Starting in the late-19th century there had been reports of the antibacterial properties of Penicillium mould, but scientists were unable to discern what process was causing the effect. The Scottish physician Alexander Fleming at St. Mary's Hospital in London (now part of Imperial College) was the first to show that Penicillium rubens had antibacterial properties. On 3 September 1928 he observed by chance that fungal contamination of a bacterial culture (Staphylococcus aureus) appeared to kill the bacteria. He confirmed this observation with a new experiment on 28 September 1928. He published his experiment in 1929, and called the antibacterial substance (the fungal extract) penicillin.

C. J. La Touche identified the fungus as Penicillium rubrum (later reclassified by Charles Thom as P. notatum and P. chrysogenum, but later corrected as P. rubens). Fleming expressed initial optimism that penicillin would be a useful antiseptic, because of its high potency and minimal toxicity in comparison to other antiseptics of the day, and noted its laboratory value in the isolation of Bacillus influenzae (now called Haemophilus influenzae).

Fleming did not convince anyone that his discovery was important. This was largely because penicillin was so difficult to isolate that its development as a drug seemed impossible. It is speculated that had Fleming been more successful at making other scientists interested in his work, penicillin would possibly have been developed years earlier.

The importance of his work has been recognised by the placement of an International Historic Chemical Landmark at the Alexander Fleming Laboratory Museum in London on 19 November 1999.

=== Development and medical application ===
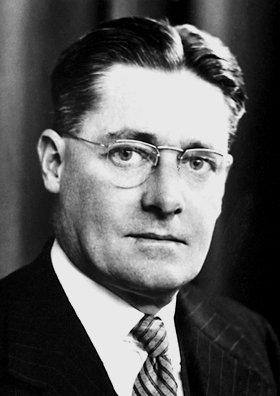
Howard Florey (pictured), Alexander Fleming and Ernst Chain shared a Nobel Prize in Physiology or Medicine in 1945 for their work on penicillin.

In 1930 Cecil George Paine, a pathologist at the Royal Infirmary in Sheffield, successfully treated ophthalmia neonatorum, a gonococcal infection in infants, with penicillin (fungal extract) on 25 November 1930.

In 1940 the Australian scientist Howard Florey (later Baron Florey) and a team of researchers (Ernst Chain, Edward Abraham, Arthur Duncan Gardner, Norman Heatley, Margaret Jennings, Jean Orr-Ewing and Arthur Gordon Sanders) at the Sir William Dunn School of Pathology of the University of Oxford made progress in making concentrated penicillin from fungal culture broth that showed both in vitro and in vivo bactericidal action. In 1941 they treated a policeman, Albert Alexander, with a severe face infection; his condition improved, but then supplies of penicillin ran out and he died. Subsequently, several other patients were treated successfully. In December 1942, survivors of the Cocoanut Grove fire in Boston, United States, were the first burn patients to be successfully treated with penicillin.

The first successful use of pure penicillin was in 1942 when Fleming cured Harry Lambert of an infection of the nervous system (streptococcal meningitis) which would otherwise have been fatal. By that time the Oxford team could produce only a small amount. Florey willingly gave the only available sample to Fleming. Lambert showed improvement from the very next day of the treatment, and was completely cured within a week. Fleming published his clinical trial in The Lancet in 1943. Following the medical breakthrough, the British War Cabinet set up the Penicillin Committee on 5 April 1943 that led to projects for mass production.

=== Mass production ===
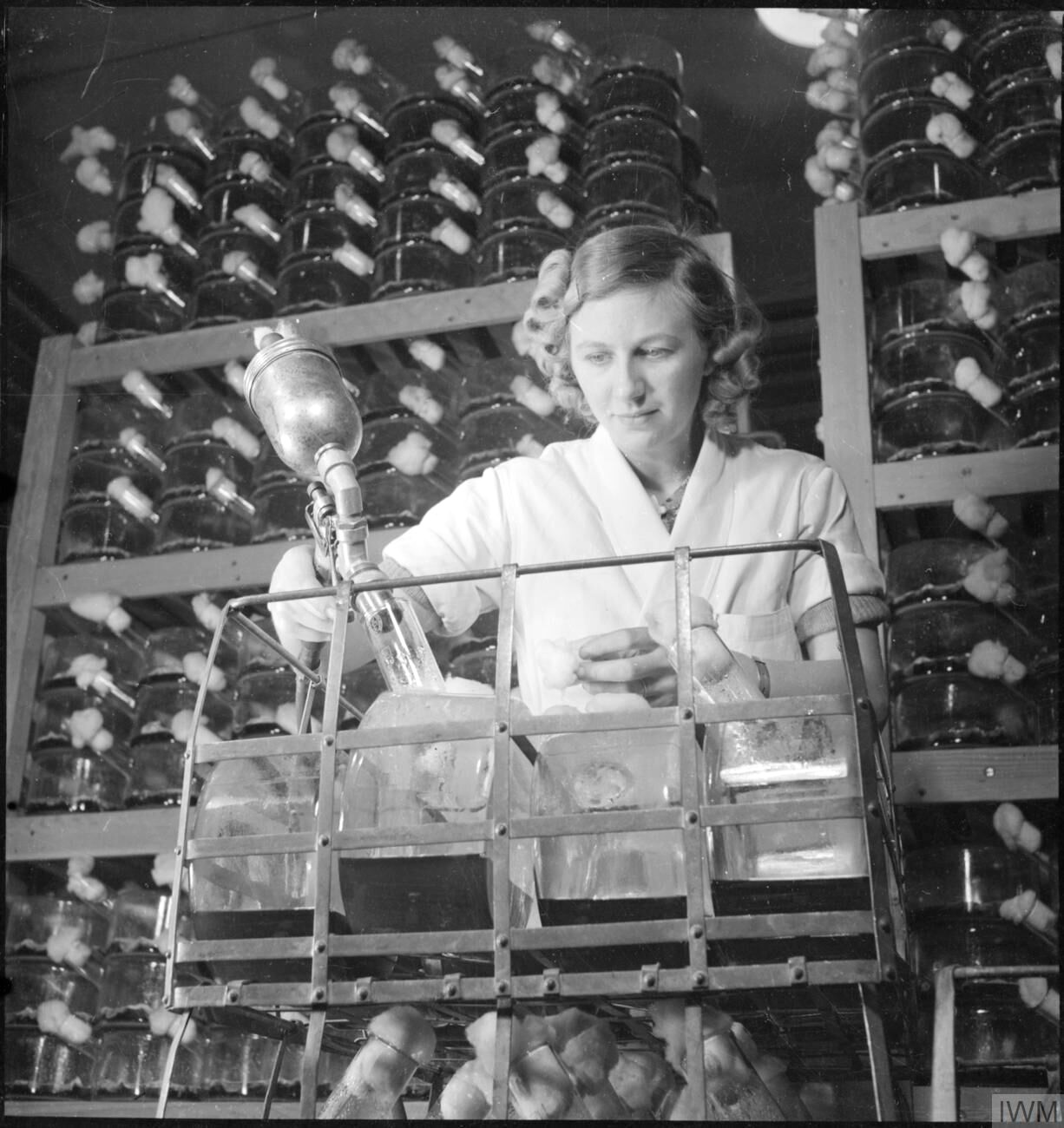
A lab technician spraying penicillin mould into flasks of corn steep liquor, England, 1943

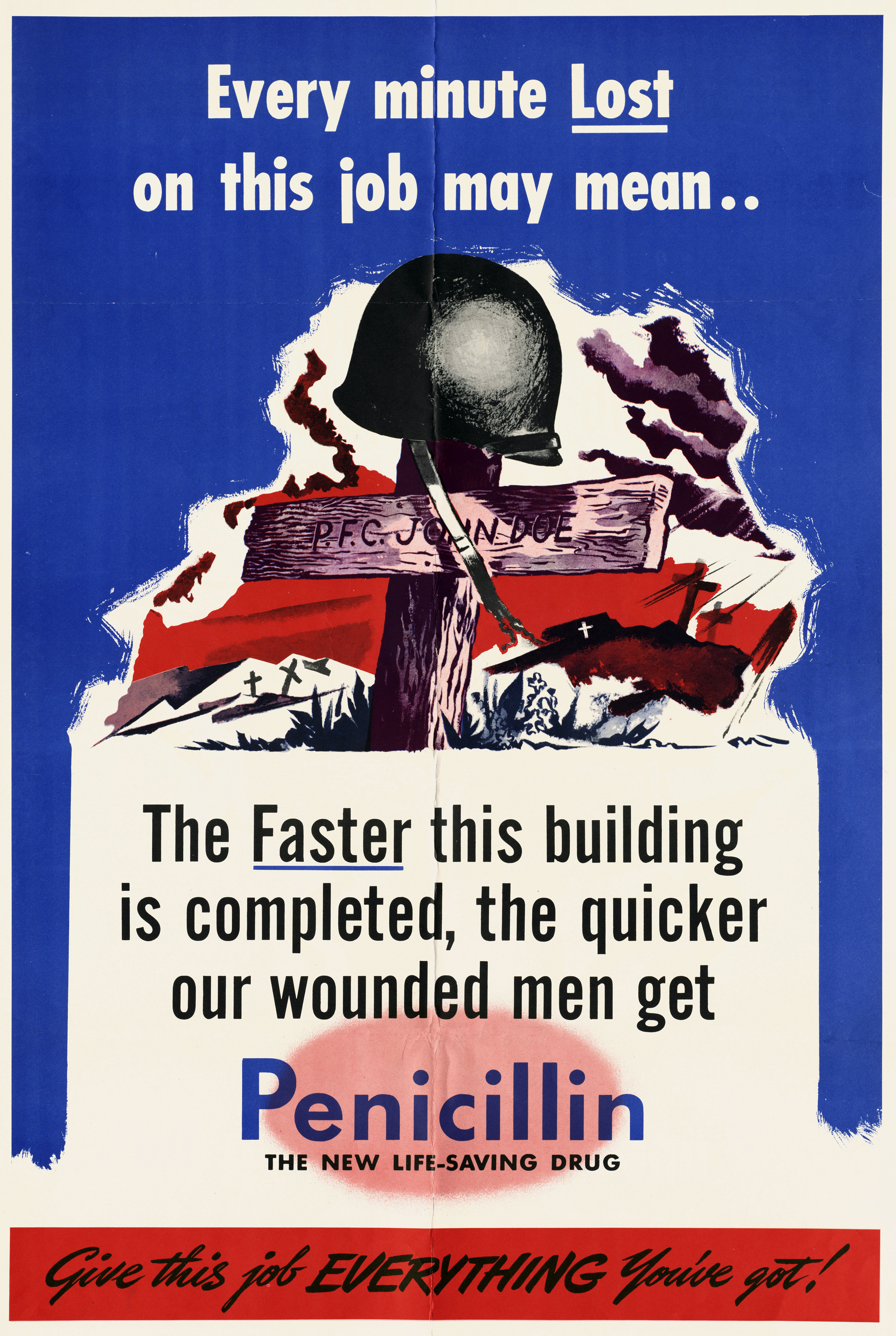
A World War II-era poster from a construction site for a penicillin factory. A military grave emphasizes the site's importance, as penicillin was urgently needed in wartime.

As the medical application was established, the Oxford team found that it was impossible to produce usable amounts in their laboratory. Failing to persuade His Majesty's Government, Florey and Heatley travelled to the US in June 1941 with their mould samples in order to interest the US federal government for large-scale production. They approached the Northern Regional Research Laboratory (NRRL, now the National Center for Agricultural Utilization Research) of the US Department of Agriculture at Peoria, Illinois, where facilities for large-scale fermentations were established. Mass culture of the mould and search for better moulds immediately followed.

On 14 March 1942 the first patient was treated for streptococcal sepsis with US-made penicillin produced by Merck & Co. Half of the total supply produced at the time was used on that one patient, Anne Miller. By June 1942, just enough US penicillin was available to treat ten patients. In July 1943 the War Production Board drew up a plan for the mass distribution of penicillin stocks to Allied troops fighting in Europe. The results of fermentation research on corn steep liquor at the NRRL allowed the United States to produce 2.3 million doses in time for the invasion of Normandy in the spring of 1944. After a worldwide search in 1943, a mouldy cantaloupe in a Peoria, Illinois market was found to contain the best strain of mould for production using the corn steep liquor process. Six times as much penicillin could be produced compared to using Fleming's mould. Jasper H. Kane, a scientist at Pfizer, suggested using a deep-tank fermentation method for producing large quantities of pharmaceutical-grade penicillin. Large-scale production resulted from the development of a deep-tank fermentation plant by the chemical engineer Margaret Hutchinson Rousseau. As a direct result of the war and the War Production Board, by June 1945 over 646 billion units per year were being produced.

G. Raymond Rettew made a significant contribution to the American war effort by his techniques to produce commercial quantities of penicillin, wherein he combined his knowledge of mushroom spawn with the function of the Sharples Cream Separator. By 1943 Rettew's lab was producing most of the world's penicillin. During the Second World War penicillin made a major difference in the number of deaths and amputations caused by infected wounds amongst Allied forces, saving an estimated 12–15% of lives. Availability was severely limited, however, by the difficulty of manufacturing large quantities of penicillin and by the rapid renal clearance of the drug, necessitating frequent dosing. Methods for mass production of penicillin were patented by Andrew Jackson Moyer in 1945. Florey had not patented penicillin, having been advised by Sir Henry Dale that doing so would be unethical.

Penicillin is actively excreted, and about 80% of a penicillin dose is cleared from the body within three to four hours of administration. Indeed, during the early penicillin era, the drug was so scarce and so highly valued that it became common to collect the urine from patients being treated, so that the penicillin in the urine could be isolated and reused. This was not a satisfactory solution, so researchers looked for a way to slow penicillin excretion. They hoped to find a molecule that could compete with penicillin for the organic acid transporter responsible for excretion, such that the transporter would preferentially excrete the competing molecule and the penicillin would be retained. The uricosuric agent probenecid proved to be suitable. When probenecid and penicillin are administered together, probenecid competitively inhibits the excretion of penicillin, increasing penicillin's concentration and prolonging its activity. Eventually, the advent of mass-production techniques and semi-synthetic penicillins resolved the supply issues, so this use of probenecid declined. Probenecid is still useful, however, for certain infections requiring particularly high concentrations of penicillins.

After the Second World War Australia was the first country to make the drug available for civilian use. In the United States penicillin was made available to the general public on 15 March 1945.

Fleming, Florey and Chain shared the 1945 Nobel Prize in Physiology or Medicine for the development of penicillin.

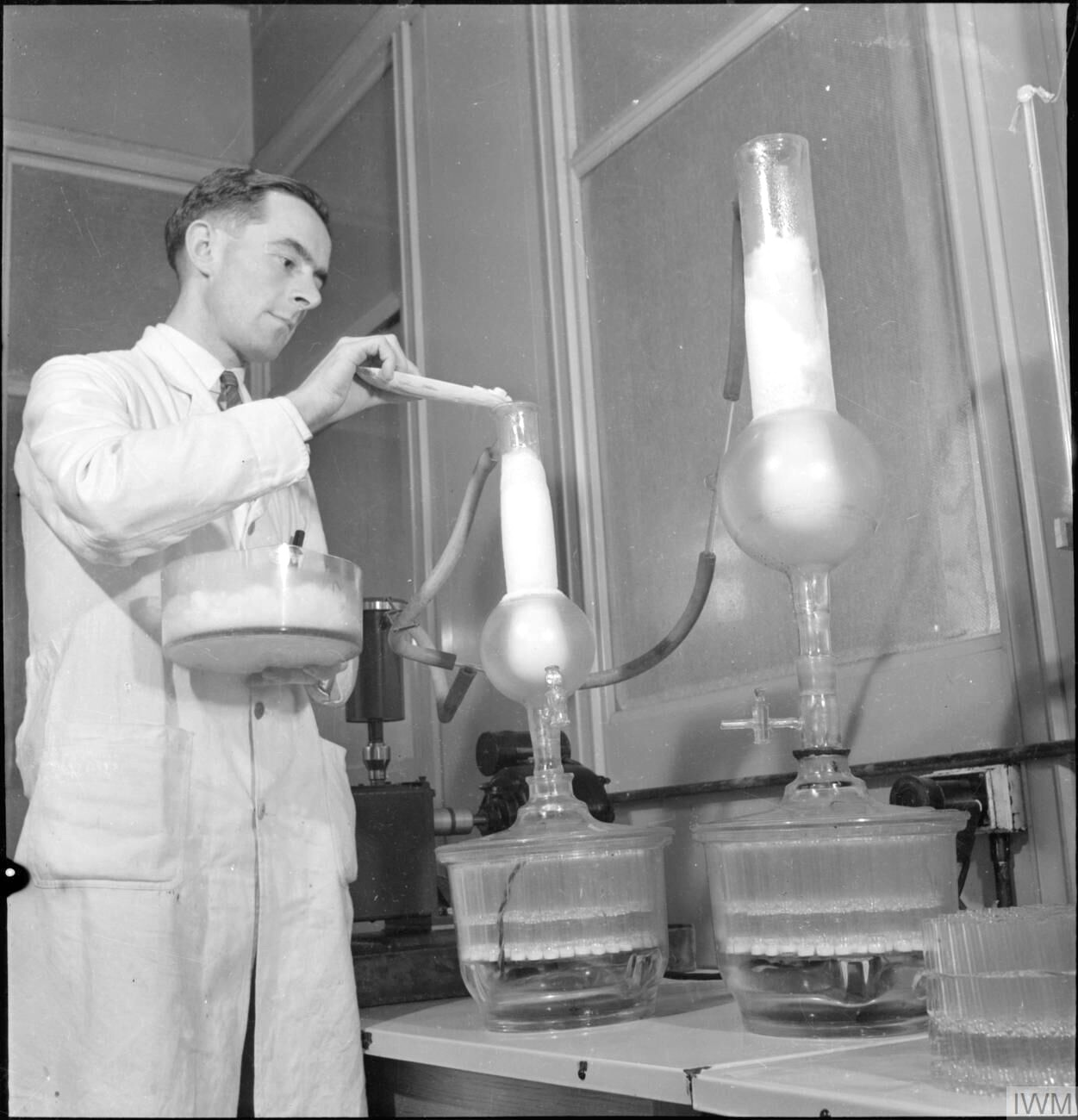
A technician preparing penicillin in 1943

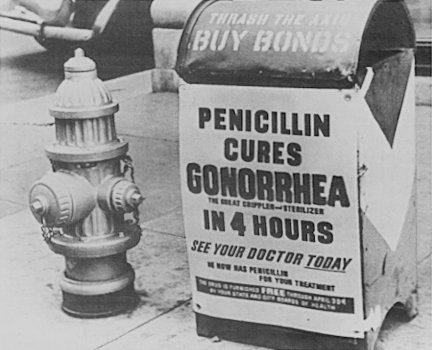
Penicillin was being mass-produced in 1944.

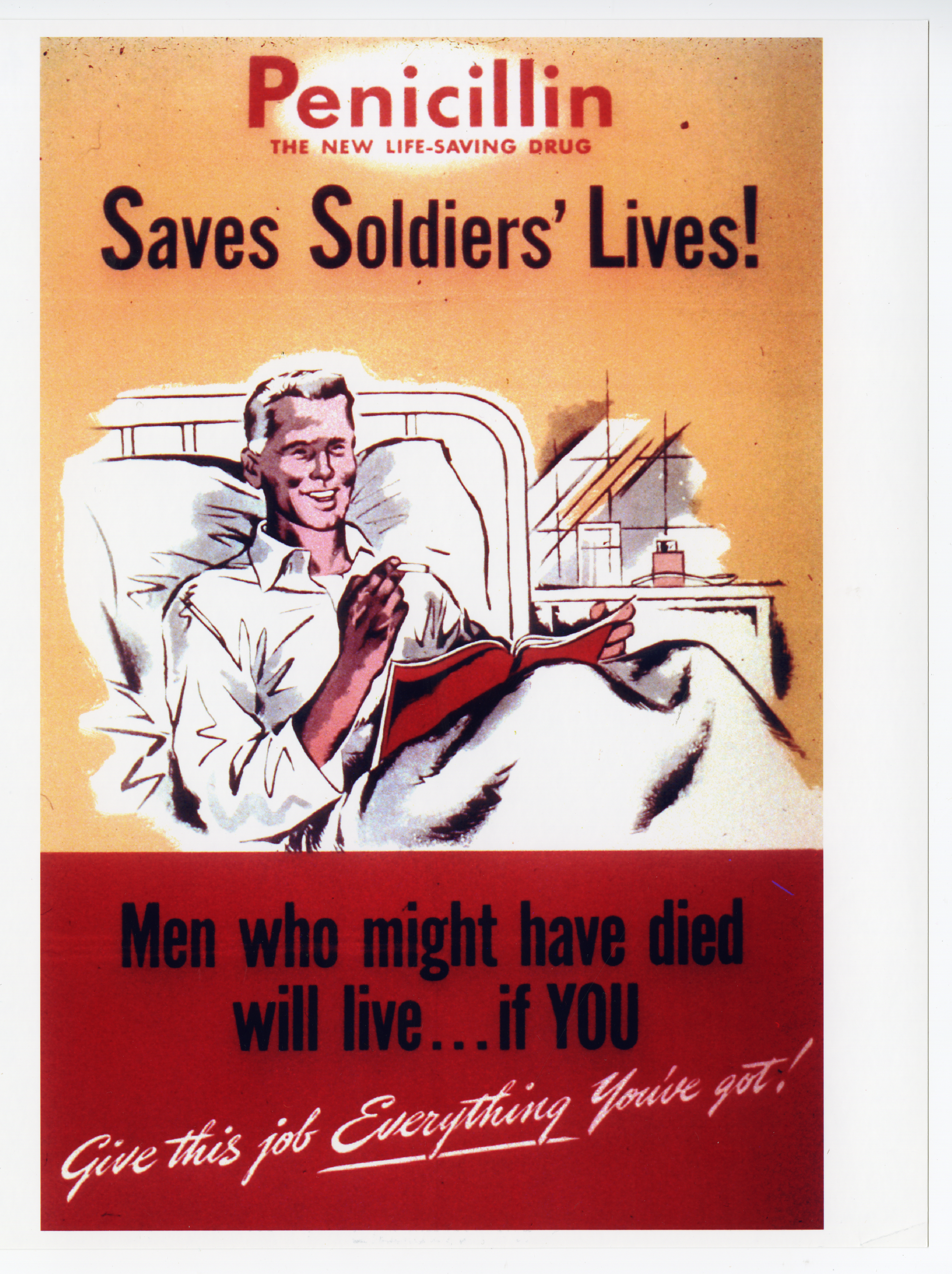
Second World War poster extolling use of penicillin

Dorothy Hodgkin determined the chemical structure of penicillin.

=== Structure determination and total synthesis ===
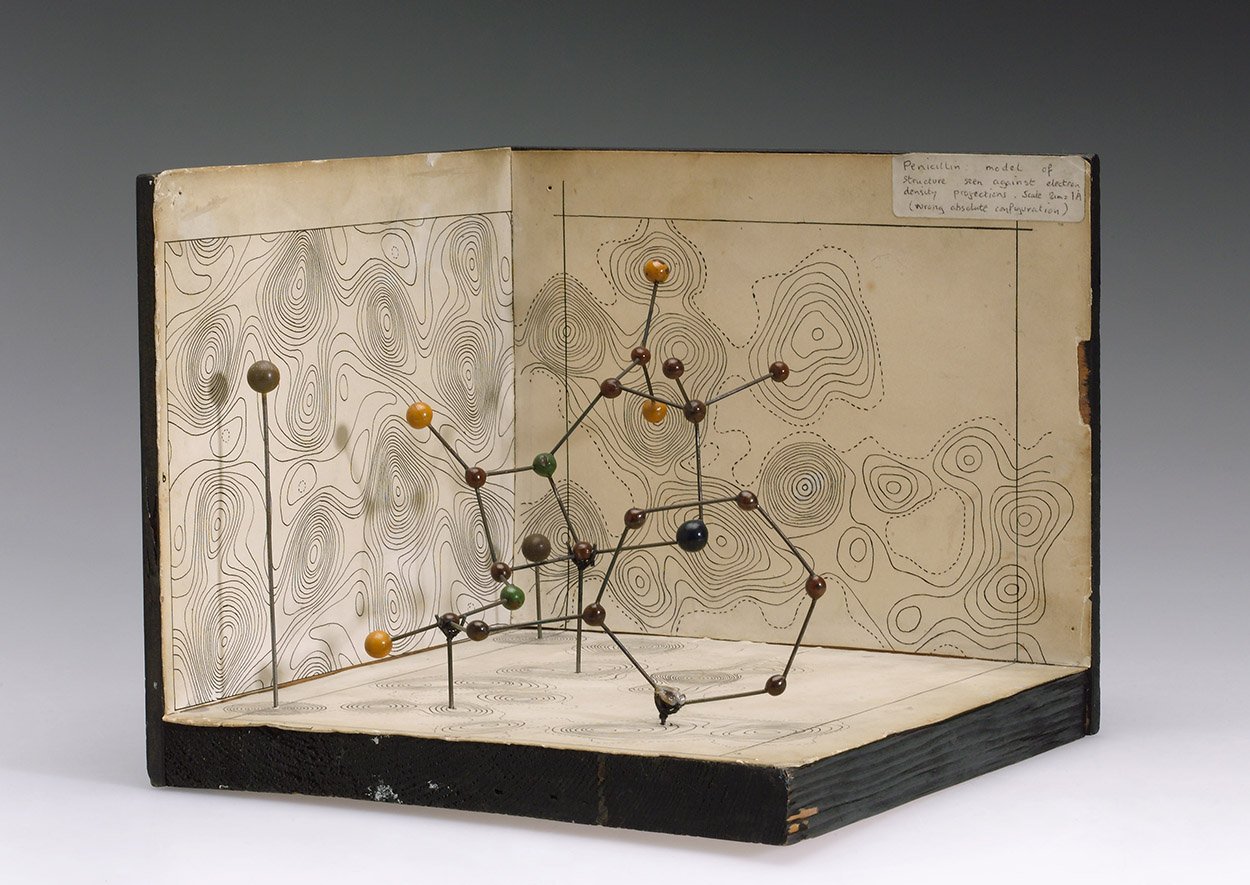
Dorothy Hodgkin's model of penicillin's structure

The chemical structure of penicillin was first proposed by Edward Abraham in 1942 and was later confirmed in 1945 using X-ray crystallography by Dorothy Crowfoot Hodgkin, who was also working at Oxford. She later in 1964 received the Nobel Prize in Chemistry for this and other structure determinations.

The chemist John C. Sheehan at the Massachusetts Institute of Technology (MIT) completed the first chemical synthesis of penicillin in 1957. Sheehan had started his studies into penicillin synthesis in 1948, and during these investigations developed new methods for the synthesis of peptides, as well as new protecting groups—groups that mask the reactivity of certain functional groups. Although the initial synthesis developed by Sheehan was not appropriate for mass production of penicillins, one of the intermediate compounds in Sheehan's synthesis was 6-aminopenicillanic acid (6-APA), the nucleus of penicillin.

6-APA was discovered by researchers at the Beecham Research Laboratories (later the Beecham Group) in Surrey in 1957 (published in 1959). Attaching different groups to the 6-APA 'nucleus' of penicillin allowed the creation of new forms of penicillins which are more versatile and better in activity.

=== Developments from penicillin ===
The narrow range of treatable diseases or "spectrum of activity" of the penicillins, along with the poor activity of the orally active phenoxymethylpenicillin, led to the search for derivatives of penicillin that could treat a wider range of infections. The isolation of 6-APA, the nucleus of penicillin, allowed for the preparation of semisynthetic penicillins, with various improvements over benzylpenicillin (bioavailability, spectrum, stability, tolerance).

The first major development was ampicillin in 1961. It offered a broader spectrum of activity than either of the original penicillins. Further development yielded β-lactamase-resistant penicillins, including flucloxacillin, dicloxacillin and methicillin. These were significant for their activity against β-lactamase-producing bacterial species, but were ineffective against the methicillin-resistant Staphylococcus aureus (MRSA) strains that subsequently emerged.

Another development of the line of true penicillins was the antipseudomonal penicillins, such as carbenicillin, ticarcillin, and piperacillin, useful for their activity against Gram-negative bacteria. However, the usefulness of the β-lactam ring was such that related antibiotics, including the mecillinams, the carbapenems, and, most importantly, the cephalosporins, still retain it at the center of their structures.

== Production ==
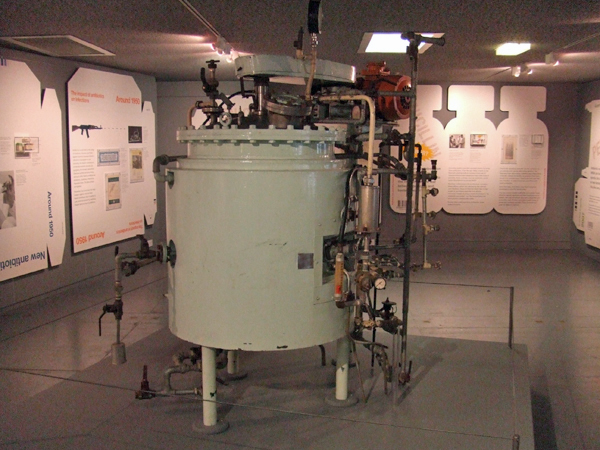
A 1957 fermentor (bioreactor) used to grow Penicillium mould

Penicillin is produced by the fermentation of various types of sugar by the fungus Penicillium rubens. The fermentation process produces penicillin as a secondary metabolite when the growth of the fungus is inhibited by stress. The biosynthetic pathway outlined below experiences feedback inhibition involving the by-product l-lysine inhibiting the enzyme homocitrate synthase.

α-ketoglutarate + AcCoA → homocitrate → L-α-aminoadipic acid → L-lysine + β-lactam

The Penicillium cells are grown using a technique called fed-batch culture, in which the cells are constantly subjected to stress, which is required for induction of penicillin production. While the usage of glucose as a carbon source represses penicillin biosynthesis enzymes, lactose does not exert any effect and alkaline pH levels override this regulation. Excess phosphate, available oxygen, and usage of ammonium as a nitrogen source repress penicillin production, while methionine can act as a sole nitrogen/sulfur source with stimulating effects.

The biotechnological method of directed evolution has been applied to produce by mutation a large number of Penicillium strains. These techniques include error-prone PCR, DNA shuffling, ITCHY and strand-overlap PCR.

=== Biosynthesis ===
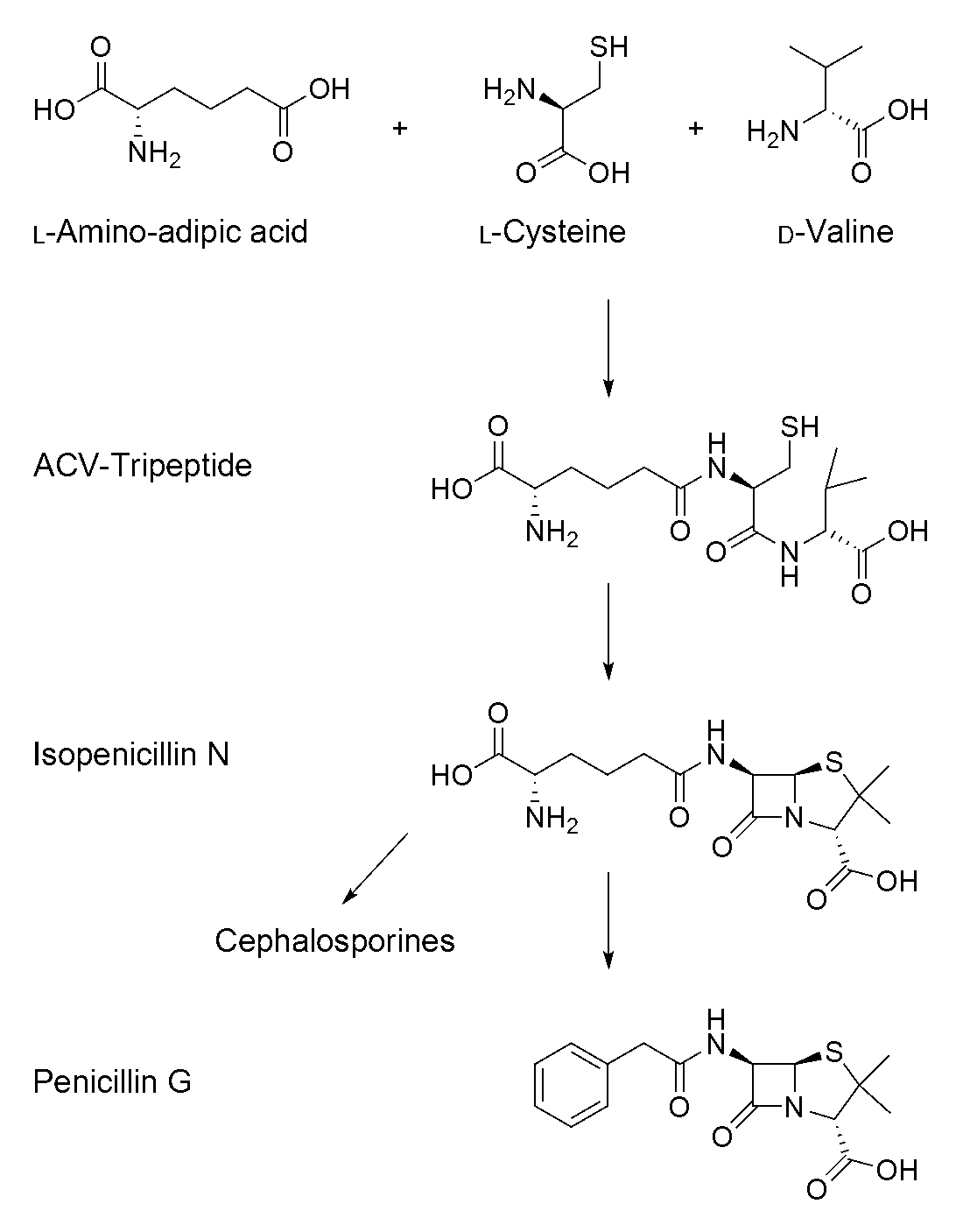
Penicillin G biosynthesis

The biosynthetic gene cluster for penicillin was first cloned and sequenced in 1990. Overall, there are three main and important steps to the biosynthesis of penicillin G (benzylpenicillin).

- The first step is the condensation of three amino acids—L-α-aminoadipic acid, L-cysteine, L-valine into a tripeptide. Before condensing into the tripeptide, the amino acid L-valine must undergo epimerization to become D-valine. The condensed tripeptide is named δ-(L-α-aminoadipyl)-L-cysteine-D-valine (ACV). The condensation reaction and epimerisation are both catalysed by the enzyme δ-(L-α-aminoadipyl)-L-cysteine-D-valine synthetase (ACVS), a nonribosomal peptide synthetase or NRPS.
- The second step in the biosynthesis of penicillin G is the oxidative conversion of linear ACV into the bicyclic intermediate isopenicillin N by isopenicillin N synthase (IPNS), which is encoded by the gene pcbC. Isopenicillin N is a very weak intermediate, because it does not show strong antibiotic activity.
- The final step is a transamidation by isopenicillin N N-acyltransferase, in which the α-aminoadipyl side-chain of isopenicillin N is removed and exchanged for a phenylacetyl side-chain. This reaction is encoded by the gene penDE, which is unique in the process of obtaining penicillins.

== See also ==
- Medicinal fungi
- Beta-lactamase
