= Ureidopenicillin =

Group of chemical compounds

Azlocillin

Piperacillin

Mezlocillin

The ureidopenicillins are a group of penicillins which are active against Pseudomonas aeruginosa.

There are three ureidopenicillins in clinical use:

- Azlocillin
- Piperacillin
- Mezlocillin

They are mostly ampicillin derivatives in which the amino acid side chain has been converted to a variety of cyclic ureas. It is speculated that the added side chain mimics a longer segment of the peptidoglycan chain, more than ampicillin, and thus would bind more easily to the penicillin-binding proteins. Ureidopenicillins are not resistant to beta-lactamases.

They are used parenterally, and are particularly indicated in infections caused by Gram-negative bacteria.
