= Isopenicillin N N-acyltransferase =

isopenicillin N N-acyltransferase

Identifiers
- EC no.: 2.3.1.164
- CAS no.: 54576-90-8

Databases
- IntEnz: IntEnz view
- BRENDA: BRENDA entry
- ExPASy: NiceZyme view
- KEGG: KEGG entry
- MetaCyc: metabolic pathway
- PRIAM: profile
- PDB structures: RCSB PDB PDBe PDBsum
- Gene Ontology: AmiGO / QuickGO
Search
- PMC: articles
- PubMed: articles
- NCBI: proteins

In enzymology, an isopenicillin N N-acyltransferase (EC 2.3.1.164) is an enzyme that catalyzes the chemical reaction

phenylacetyl-CoA + isopenicillin N + H_{2}O $\rightleftharpoons$ CoA + penicillin G + L-2-aminohexanedioate

The 3 substrates of this enzyme are phenylacetyl-CoA, isopenicillin N, and H_{2}O, whereas its 3 products are CoA, penicillin G, and L-2-aminohexanedioate.

This enzyme belongs to the family of transferases, specifically those acyltransferases transferring groups other than aminoacyl groups. The systematic name of this enzyme class is acyl-CoA:isopenicillin N N-acyltransferase. Other names in common use include acyl-coenzyme A:isopenicillin N acyltransferase, and isopenicillin N:acyl-CoA: acyltransferase. This enzyme participates in hydrophobic penicillins biosynthesis.
