= Aminopenicillin =

Group of antibiotics

Generalized structure of aminopenicillins

ampicillin

The aminopenicillins are members of the penicillin family that are structural analogs of ampicillin (which is the 2-amino derivative of benzylpenicillin, hence the name). Like other penicillins and beta-lactam antibiotics, they contain a beta-lactam ring that is crucial to its antibacterial activity.

In the aminopenicillins the amino group is protonated to give the ammonium derivative, which enhances their uptake through bacterial porin channels. This does not, however, prevent resistance conferred by bacterial beta-lactamases. Members of this family include ampicillin, amoxicillin and bacampicillin.

== See also ==
- Penicillin
- Extended-spectrum penicillin
- Carboxypenicillin
- β-Lactamase inhibitor
