= Azlocillin =

Beta-lactam antibiotic

Clinical data
- Trade names: Securopen
- AHFS/Drugs.com: International Drug Names
- ATC code: J01CA09 (WHO)

Identifiers
- IUPAC name: (2S,5R,6R)-3,3-dimethyl-7-oxo-6-[((2R)-2-{[(2-oxoimidazolidin-1-yl)carbonyl]amino}-2-phenylacetyl)amino]-4-thia-1-azabicyclo[3.2.0]heptane-2-carboxylic acid
- CAS Number: 37091-66-0
- PubChem CID: 6479523
- DrugBank: DB01061
- ChemSpider: 4980416
- UNII: HUM6H389W0
- KEGG: D02339
- ChEBI: CHEBI:2956
- ChEMBL: ChEMBL1537
- CompTox Dashboard (EPA): DTXSID1022639
- ECHA InfoCard: 100.048.483

Chemical and physical data
- Formula: C_{20}H_{23}N_{5}O_{6}S
- Molar mass: 461.49 g·mol^{−1}
- 3D model (JSmol): Interactive image
- SMILES: O=C(O)[C@@H]3N4C(=O)[C@@H](NC(=O)[C@@H](c1ccccc1)NC(=O)N2C(=O)NCC2)[C@H]4SC3(C)C
- InChI: InChI=1S/C20H23N5O6S/c1-20(2)13(17(28)29)25-15(27)12(16(25)32-20)22-14(26)11(10-6-4-3-5-7-10)23-19(31)24-9-8-21-18(24)30/h3-7,11-13,16H,8-9H2,1-2H3,(H,21,30)(H,22,26)(H,23,31)(H,28,29)/t11-,12-,13+,16-/m1/s1; Key:JTWOMNBEOCYFNV-NFFDBFGFSA-N

Azlocillin is an acyl ampicillin antibiotic with an extended spectrum of activity and greater in vitro potency than the carboxy penicillins. Azlocillin is similar to mezlocillin and piperacillin. It demonstrates antibacterial activity against a broad spectrum of bacteria, including Pseudomonas aeruginosa, and, in contrast to most cephalosporins, exhibits activity against enterococci.

== Spectrum of bacterial susceptibility ==
Azlocillin is considered a broad spectrum antibiotic and can be used against a number of Gram positive and Gram negative bacteria. The following represents MIC susceptibility data for a few medically significant organisms.

- Escherichia coli 1 μg/mL – 32 μg/mL
- Haemophilus spp. 0.03 μg/mL – 2 μg/mL
- Pseudomonas aeruginosa 4 μg/mL – 6.25 μg/mL
- Borrelia burgdorferi 0.5 μg/mL

== Synthesis ==
Azlocillin synthesis: eidem

Azlocillin synthesis 2:

An interesting alternative synthesis of azlocillin involves activation of the substituted phenylglycine analogue 1 with 1,3-dimethyl-2-chloro-1-imidazolinium chloride (2) and then condensation with 6-APA.

== Research ==
In March 2020, a preclinical study conducted by researchers at Stanford University and published in Scientific Reports identified azlocillin as a potential treatment candidate for Lyme disease. In a mouse model, the study demonstrated that azlocillin was effective in eradicating Borrelia burgdorferi, the bacterium responsible for the disease. Notably, azlocillin showed in vitro and in vivo efficacy against drug-tolerant "persister" cells, which can survive standard antibiotic regimens like doxycycline and ceftriaxone. The research also indicated that azlocillin was effective at lower minimum inhibitory concentrations (MIC) than conventional treatments, suggesting a potential for reduced collateral impact on the host microbiome.

== See also ==
- Methicillin
