= Mezlocillin =

Beta-lactam antibiotic

Clinical data
- Trade names: Baypen
- AHFS/Drugs.com: Micromedex Detailed Consumer Information
- Pregnancy category: B
- Routes of administration: Intravenous, intramuscular
- ATC code: J01CA10 (WHO)

Pharmacokinetic data
- Protein binding: 16–59%
- Metabolism: Hepatic (20–30%)
- Elimination half-life: 1.3–4.4 hours
- Excretion: Renal (50%) and biliary

Identifiers
- IUPAC name: (2S,5R,6R)-3,3-dimethyl-6-{[(2R)-2-({[3-(methylsulfonyl)-2-oxoimidazolidin-1-yl]carbonyl}amino)-2-phenyl-acetyl]amino}-7-oxo-4-thia-1-azabicyclo[3.2.0]heptane-2-carboxylic acid
- CAS Number: 51481-65-3
- PubChem CID: 656511
- DrugBank: DB00948
- ChemSpider: 570894
- UNII: OH2O403D1G
- KEGG: D05021
- ChEBI: CHEBI:6919
- ChEMBL: ChEMBL1731
- CompTox Dashboard (EPA): DTXSID1023316
- ECHA InfoCard: 100.052.013

Chemical and physical data
- Formula: C_{21}H_{25}N_{5}O_{8}S_{2}
- Molar mass: 539.58 g·mol^{−1}
- 3D model (JSmol): Interactive image
- SMILES: O=C(O)[C@@H]3N4C(=O)[C@@H](NC(=O)[C@@H](c1ccccc1)NC(=O)N2C(=O)N(S(=O)(=O)C)CC2)[C@H]4SC3(C)C
- InChI: InChI=1S/C21H25N5O8S2/c1-21(2)14(18(29)30)26-16(28)13(17(26)35-21)22-15(27)12(11-7-5-4-6-8-11)23-19(31)24-9-10-25(20(24)32)36(3,33)34/h4-8,12-14,17H,9-10H2,1-3H3,(H,22,27)(H,23,31)(H,29,30)/t12-,13-,14+,17-/m1/s1; Key:YPBATNHYBCGSSN-VWPFQQQWSA-N

Mezlocillin is a broad-spectrum penicillin antibiotic. It is active against both Gram-negative and some Gram-positive bacteria. Unlike most other extended spectrum penicillins, it is excreted by the liver, therefore it is useful for biliary tract infections, such as ascending cholangitis.

== Mechanism of action ==
Like all other beta-lactam antibiotics, mezlocillin inhibits the third and last stage of bacterial cell wall synthesis by binding to penicillin binding proteins. This ultimately leads to cell lysis.

== Susceptible organisms ==
=== Gram-negative ===
- Bacteroides spp., including B. fragilis
- Enterobacter spp.
- Escherichia coli
- Haemophilus influenzae
- Klebsiella species
- Morganella morganii
- Neisseria gonorrhoeae
- Proteus mirabilis
- Proteus vulgaris
- Providencia rettgeri
- Pseudomonas spp., including P. aeruginosa
- Serratia marcescens

=== Gram-positive ===
- Enterococcus faecalis
- Peptococcus spp.
- Peptostreptococcus spp.

== Synthesis ==
Mezlocillin synthesis:

Mezlocillin can be made in a variety of ways including reaction of ampicillin with chlorocarbamate 1 in the presence of triethylamine. Chlorocarbamate 1 itself is made from ethylenediamine by reaction with phosgene to form the cyclic urea followed by monoamide formation with methanesulfonyl chloride and then reaction of the other nitrogen atom with phosgene and trimethylsilylchloride.

The closely related analogue azlocillin is made in essentially the same manner as mezlocillin. but with omission of the methylation step.
