= Gram-negative bacteria =

Group of bacteria that do not retain the Gram stain used in bacterial differentiation

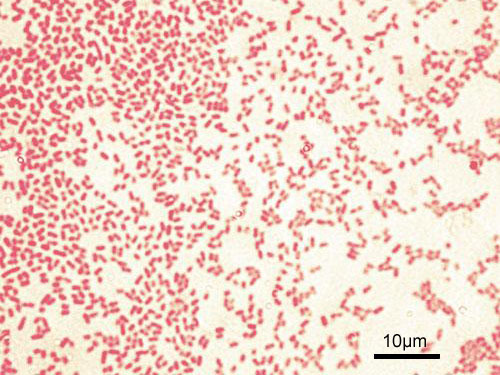
Microscopic image of gram-negative Pseudomonas aeruginosa bacteria (pink-red rods)

Gram-negative bacteria are bacteria that, unlike gram-positive bacteria, do not retain the crystal violet stain used in the Gram staining method of bacterial differentiation. Their defining characteristic is that their cell envelope consists of a thin peptidoglycan cell wall sandwiched between an inner (cytoplasmic) membrane and an outer membrane. These bacteria are found in all environments that support life on Earth.

Within this category, notable species include the model organism Escherichia coli, along with various pathogenic bacteria, such as Pseudomonas aeruginosa, Chlamydia trachomatis, and Yersinia pestis. They pose significant challenges in the medical field due to their outer membrane, which acts as a protective barrier against numerous antibiotics (including penicillin), detergents that would normally damage the inner cell membrane, and the antimicrobial enzyme lysozyme produced by animals as part of their innate immune system. Furthermore, the outer leaflet of this membrane contains a complex lipopolysaccharide (LPS) whose lipid A component can trigger a toxic reaction when the bacteria are lysed by immune cells. This reaction may lead to septic shock, resulting in low blood pressure, respiratory failure, reduced oxygen delivery, and lactic acidosis.

Several classes of antibiotics have been developed to target gram-negative bacteria, including aminopenicillins, ureidopenicillins, cephalosporins, beta-lactam-betalactamase inhibitor combinations (such as piperacillin-tazobactam), folate antagonists, quinolones, and carbapenems. Many of these antibiotics also cover gram-positive bacteria. The antibiotics that specifically target gram-negative bacteria include aminoglycosides, monobactams (such as aztreonam), and ciprofloxacin.

== Characteristics ==
Gram-negative (LPS-diderm) cell wall structure

Gram-positive and gram-negative bacteria are differentiated chiefly by their cell wall structure

Conventional gram-negative (LPS-diderm) bacteria display the following characteristics:

- An inner cell membrane is present (cytoplasmic)
- A thin peptidoglycan layer is present (this is much thicker in gram-positive bacteria)
- Has outer membrane containing lipopolysaccharides (LPS, which consists of lipid A, core polysaccharide, and O antigen) in its outer leaflet and phospholipids in the inner leaflet
- Porins exist in the outer membrane, which act like pores for particular molecules
- Between the outer membrane and the cytoplasmic membrane there is a space filled with a concentrated gel-like substance called periplasm
- The S-layer is directly attached to the outer membrane rather than to the peptidoglycan
- If present, flagella have four supporting rings instead of two
- Teichoic acids or lipoteichoic acids are absent
- Lipoproteins are attached to the polysaccharide backbone
- Some contain Braun's lipoprotein, which serves as a link between the outer membrane and the peptidoglycan chain by a covalent bond
- Most, with few exceptions, do not form spores

However, the LPS-diderm group (corresponding to kingdom Pseudomonadati, formerly "Hydrobacteria") is not the only type of bacteria that stain negative. Mycobacterium (or rather most of Mycobacteriales), which does not belong in the group, have independently evolved an outer cell membrane, with a cell wall made of mycolic acid. This gives it very different structure and features.

In many gram-negative bacteria, the IgaA membrane protein negatively regulates the Rcs phosphorelay system, a key envelope stress response pathway that helps maintain cell envelope integrity.

== Classification ==
Along with cell shape, Gram staining is a rapid diagnostic tool and once was used to group species at the subdivision of Bacteria. Historically, the kingdom Monera was divided into four divisions based on Gram staining: Firmicutes (+), Gracillicutes (−), Mollicutes (0) and Mendocutes (var.). Since 1987, the monophyly of the gram-negative bacteria has been disproven with molecular studies.

Current knowledge divides the gram-negative bacteria into two large groups and some straddlers. The more "conventional" with an LPS outer membrane do share a common ancestor and are grouped in kingdom Pseudomonadati. The less conventional ones are the order Mycobacteriales, that have a mycolic acid cell wall and an outer membrane. The kingdom and the order are each monophyletic (or rather, not holyphyletic), but the "LPS-diderm" and "mycolic-diderm" groups are not, because some bacteria in the kingdom and the order do not stain gram negative. They will be discussed in the next section.

== Taxonomy ==
Bacteria are traditionally classified based on their Gram-staining response into the gram-positive and gram-negative bacteria. Having just one membrane, the gram-positive bacteria are also known as monoderm bacteria, while gram-negative bacteria, having two membranes, are also known as diderm bacteria. It was traditionally thought that the groups represent lineages, i.e., the extra membrane only evolved once, such that gram-negative bacteria are more closely related to one another than to any gram-positive bacteria. While this is often true, the classification system breaks down in some cases, with lineage groupings not matching the staining result. Thus, Gram staining cannot be reliably used to assess familial relationships of bacteria. Nevertheless, staining often gives reliable information about the composition of the cell membrane, distinguishing between the presence or absence of an outer lipid membrane.

Of these two structurally distinct groups of prokaryotic organisms, monoderm prokaryotes are thought to be ancestral. Based upon a number of different observations, including that the gram-positive bacteria are the most sensitive to antibiotics and that the gram-negative bacteria are, in general, resistant to antibiotics, it has been proposed that the outer cell membrane in gram-negative bacteria (diderms) evolved as a protective mechanism against antibiotic selection pressure. Some bacteria such as Deinococcus, which stain gram-positive due to the presence of a thick peptidoglycan layer, but also possess an outer cell membrane are suggested as intermediates in the transition between monoderm (gram-positive) and diderm (gram-negative) bacteria.

The conventional LPS-diderm group of gram-negative bacteria (e.g., Pseudomonadota, Aquificota, Chlamydiota, Bacteroidota, Chlorobiota, Cyanobacteria, Fibrobacterota, Verrucomicrobiota, Planctomycetota, Spirochaetota, Acidobacteriota) are uniquely identified by a few conserved signature indel (CSI) in the HSP60 (GroEL) protein. The presence of this CSI in all sequenced species of conventional lipopolysaccharide-containing gram-negative bacterial phyla provides evidence that these phyla of bacteria form a monophyletic clade and that no loss of the outer membrane from any species from this group has occurred. They have accordingly been assigned a kingdom Pseudomonadati (formerly "Hydrobacteria").

The difficulty lies in the other taxa that also have a diderm structure.

- The first group is paraphyletic. It includes a number of taxa (including Negativicutes, Fusobacteriota, Synergistota, and Elusimicrobiota) that are either part of the phylum Bacillota (a monoderm group) or branches in its proximity. They lack the GroEL CSI signature, which is proof that they do not belong in the former group. Some members are likely monoderm, just with a very thin layer of LPS to not appear on the stain. Others have more convoluted structures.
- The second group are the clinically relevant Mycobacterium, expanding to most of its encompassing order of Mycobacteriales. They do not have the CSI, and their cell wall is made of a different substance: mycolic acid.

=== Example species ===
The proteobacteria are a major superphylum of gram-negative bacteria, including E. coli, Salmonella, Shigella, and other Enterobacteriaceae, Pseudomonas, Moraxella, Helicobacter, Stenotrophomonas, Bdellovibrio, acetic acid bacteria, Legionella etc. Other notable groups of gram-negative bacteria include the cyanobacteria, spirochaetes, and green sulfur bacteria.

Medically relevant gram-negative diplococci include the four types that cause a sexually transmitted disease (Neisseria gonorrhoeae), a meningitis (Neisseria meningitidis), and respiratory symptoms (Moraxella catarrhalis, A coccobacillus Haemophilus influenzae is another medically relevant coccal type.

Medically relevant gram-negative bacilli include a multitude of species. Some of them cause primarily respiratory problems (Klebsiella pneumoniae, Legionella pneumophila, Pseudomonas aeruginosa), primarily urinary problems (Escherichia coli, Proteus mirabilis, Enterobacter cloacae, Serratia marcescens), and primarily gastrointestinal problems (Helicobacter pylori, Salmonella enteritidis, Salmonella typhi).

Gram-negative bacteria associated with hospital-acquired infections include Acinetobacter baumannii, which cause bacteremia, secondary meningitis, and ventilator-associated pneumonia in hospital intensive-care units.

== Bacterial transformation ==
Transformation is one of three processes for horizontal gene transfer, in which exogenous genetic material passes from one bacterium to another, the other two being conjugation (transfer of genetic material between two bacterial cells in direct contact) and transduction (injection of foreign DNA by a bacteriophage virus into the host bacterium). In transformation, the genetic material passes through the intervening medium, and uptake is completely dependent on the recipient bacterium.

As of 2014 about 80 species of bacteria were known to be capable of transformation, about evenly divided between gram-positive and gram-negative bacteria; the number might be an overestimate since several of the reports are supported by single papers. Transformation has been studied in medically important gram-negative bacteria species such as Helicobacter pylori, Legionella pneumophila, Neisseria meningitidis, Neisseria gonorrhoeae, Haemophilus influenzae and Vibrio cholerae. It has also been studied in gram-negative species found in soil such as Pseudomonas stutzeri, Acinetobacter baylyi, and gram-negative plant pathogens such as Ralstonia solanacearum and Xylella fastidiosa.

== Role in disease ==
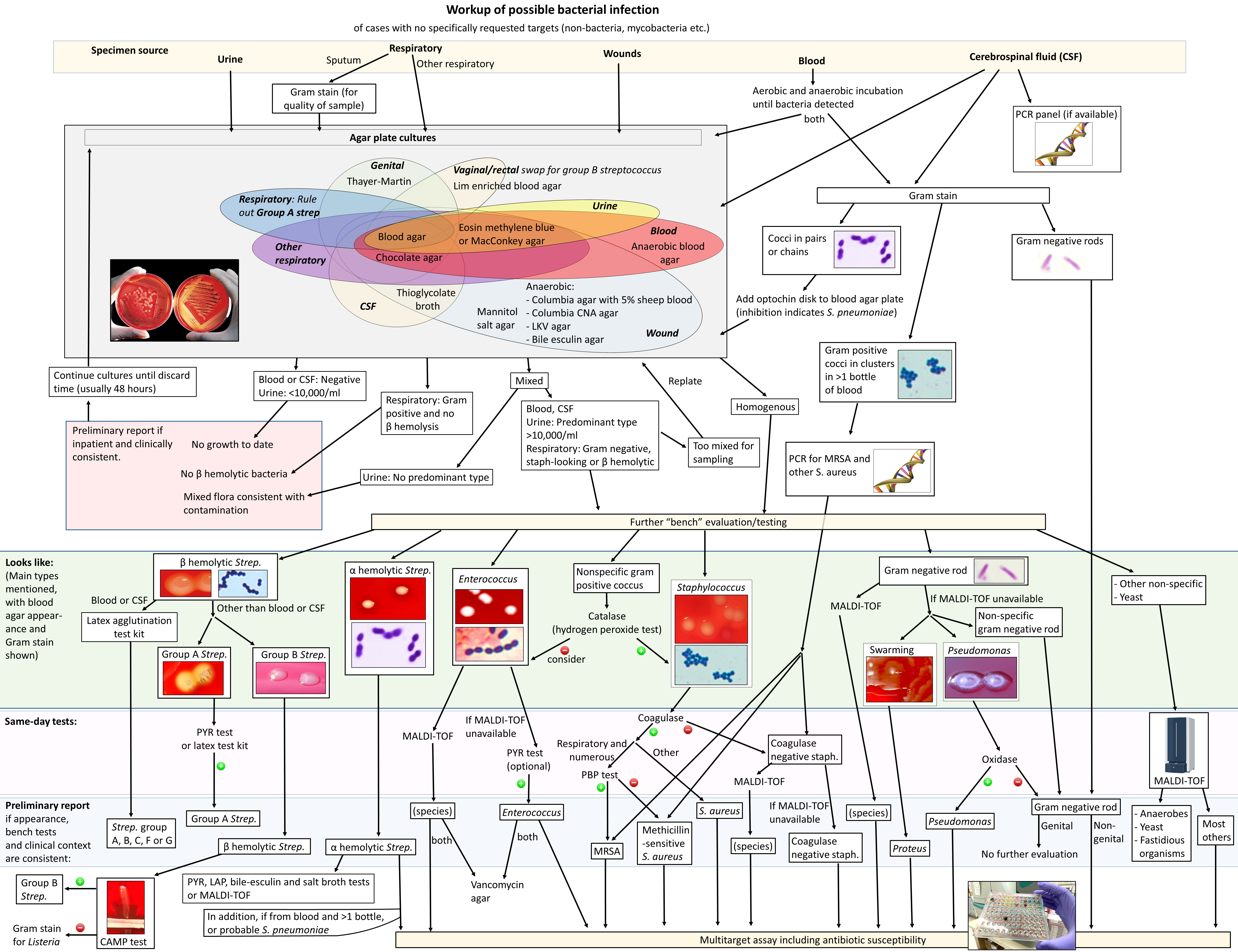
Example of a workup algorithm of possible bacterial infection in cases with no specifically requested targets (non-bacteria, mycobacteria etc.), with most common situations and agents seen in a New England setting. Clinically significant gram-negative bacteria are usually rods, as shown near bottom right. Although some gram-negative bacteria can be recognized by "bench tests", diagnosis in the modern microbiology lab usually involves MALDI-TOF and/or multitarget assay.

One of the several unique characteristics of gram-negative bacteria is the structure of the bacterial outer membrane. The outer leaflet of this membrane contains lipopolysaccharide (LPS), whose lipid A portion acts as an endotoxin. If gram-negative bacteria enter the circulatory system, LPS can trigger an innate immune response, activating the immune system and producing cytokines (hormonal regulators). This leads to inflammation and can cause a toxic reaction, resulting in fever, an increased respiratory rate, and low blood pressure. That is why some infections with gram-negative bacteria can lead to life-threatening septic shock.

The outer membrane protects the bacteria from several antibiotics, dyes, and detergents that would normally damage either the inner membrane or the cell wall (made of peptidoglycan). The outer membrane provides these bacteria with resistance to lysozyme and penicillin. The periplasmic space (space between the two cell membranes) also contains enzymes which break down or modify antibiotics. Drugs commonly used to treat Gram negative infections include amino, carboxy and ureido penicillins (ampicillin, amoxicillin, pipercillin, ticarcillin). These drugs may be combined with beta-lactamase inhibitors to combat the presence of enzymes that can digest these drugs (known as beta-lactamases) in the peri-plasmic space. Other classes of drugs that have Gram negative spectrum include cephalosporins, monobactams (aztreonam), aminoglycosides, quinolones, macrolides, chloramphenicol, folate antagonists, and carbapenems.

== Orthography: capitalization ==
The adjectives Gram-positive and Gram-negative derive from the surname of Hans Christian Gram, a Danish bacteriologist; as eponymous adjectives, their initial letter G can be either capital or lower-case, depending on which style guide is being adopted. For instance, the style guide of the American CDC recommends writing: Gram stain, this species is gram negative, and a gram-negative species.

== See also ==
- Autochaperone
- Gram-variable and gram-indeterminate bacteria
- OMPdb (2011)
- Outer membrane receptor
