= C15H13FO2 =

The molecular formula C_{15}H_{13}FO_{2} (molar mass: 244.261 g/mol, exact mass: 244.089958 u) may refer to:

- Flurbiprofen
- Tarenflurbil (also called Flurizan)
