= Stewart Adams (chemist) =

English chemist (1923–2019)

Stewart Adams OBE
- Born: Stewart Sanders Adams; 16 April 1923; Byfield, Northamptonshire, England
- Died: 30 January 2019 (aged 95); Nottingham, England
- Education: Leeds University
- Known for: Development of Ibuprofen
- Spouse: Mary (m. 1950)
- Scientific career
- Workplaces: Boots Pure Drug Company

Stewart Sanders Adams OBE (16 April 1923 – 30 January 2019) was an English pharmacist, and bioengineer who was part of a team from Boots which developed the painkiller ibuprofen in 1961. Ibuprofen is now on the World Health Organization's Model List of Essential Medicines and is one of the world's best-selling drugs.

== Early life ==
Adams was born in Byfield, Northamptonshire, at 4 New Terrace (later re-numbered as no. 7) on 16 April 1923. His father was a railwayman, and grew up in a rural farming area in Northamptonshire. Adams was an only child.

Adams went to Byfield Council School, then his parents moved in 1933 to Doncaster, and he went to Doncaster Grammar School, then in 1937, to March, Isle of Ely, where he attended March Grammar School; he left school aged 15 in 1939. He became a pharmacist, on a three-year apprenticeship, at a Boots chemist in March. From this he gained an interest in science, and Boots paid for him to do a B.Pharm degree at University College, Nottingham, which he was awarded in 1945.

== Career ==
Structure of the ibuprofen NSAID

He rejoined the Boots company in 1945 and worked on their project to produce penicillin. He was moved to the research department of Boots and he went on to research rheumatoid arthritis. This was followed by a PhD in pharmacology at Leeds University returning to Boots in 1952. It was funded by a £600 research scholarship from the Pharmaceutical Society that was matched by Boots and focussed on the heparin-histamine relationships. At the time, the main medicine for the condition were corticosteroids and high doses of aspirin, which had such side effects as gastrointestinal problems and allergic reactions.

=== Ibuprofen ===
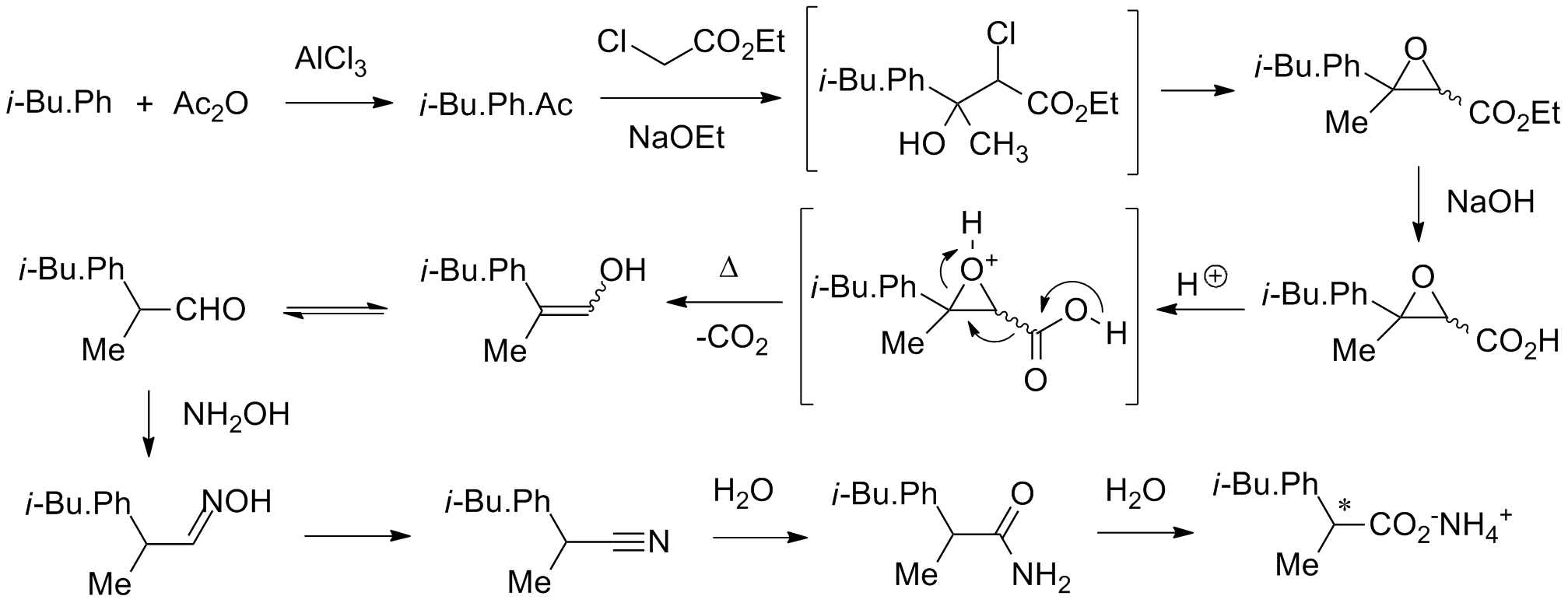
How to make 2-(4-isobutylphenyl) propanoic acid

At the Boots Pure Drug Company in 1953, Adams began work on other chemical substances that could have a pain-killing effect, centred on rheumatoid arthritis. He worked in a house in the south of Nottingham for many years, as the main labs had been destroyed in the war, then moved to Boots Pharmaceuticals new building on Pennyfoot Street in 1960. This is now BioCity Nottingham.

In August 1958 on Rutland Road in West Bridgford, the team, with Oxford-educated organic chemist John Nicholson (1925–83), looked at phenoxy acids. In 1961 the team started looking at phenyl-propanoic acids, and things were looking good. One of the types was 2-(4-isobutylphenyl) propanoic acid; ibuprofen was first made in December 1961.

Four substances that went to clinical trial failed, and the last – ibuprofen – worked; it was first called RD 13621, and RB 1472. He took the first dose himself and used the drug to treat his own headaches before it was on the market. Animal tests were very encouraging, and tests on humans showed it was about three times stronger than aspirin. He had read in a German journal about ultra-violet-induced erythema on the skin of shaved guinea pigs discovered by Parke-Davis, so he could test anti-inflammatory treatments; the UV-light came from a Kromayer Lamp. Some drugs had had amazing effects on albino guinea pigs, but none on humans. It had low GI toxicity in dogs. Boots also now wanted the new chemical to reduce fever (an antipyretic effect). The work was supported in the 1950s by the Empire Rheumatism Council (now Arthritis Research UK). The first clinical trials were by Dr. Tom Chalmers at the Rheumatic Diseases Unit at the Northern General Hospital, Edinburgh (which closed around 1990) in 1966.

=== Licensing ===
A patent was filed in 1962, and granted in 1962, for phenylalkane derivatives. In 1969 ibuprofen was licensed as a prescription drug in the UK, and in 1974 in the US. It was launched in the US in 1974 by Upjohn of Kalamazoo, Michigan, as Motrin. In April 1966, Ibufenac (iso-butyl-phenyl-acetic-acid, known as Dytransin) went onto the UK market, but was withdrawn in January 1968 due to causing jaundice, from its toxicity in the liver.

=== General pharmacies ===
In August 1978, Boots applied to have ibuprofen put in general pharmacies, but the Committee on Safety of Medicines (DHSS) declined; in April 1982, there was another request by Boots. Ibuprofen became on sale for general pharmacy (over-the-counter) in 1983, as Nurofen. Adams said in 2007 "Getting the drug approved by the two countries with the toughest regulatory authorities – the UK and the US – was a goal I wanted to achieve. For me, that was the most exciting time of all." Nurofen was launched 8 August 1983 by Crookes Products Ltd. Ibuprofen went over the counter in the US in June 1984 by the Food and Drug Administration, made by American Home Products. In America, it was made by Whitehall Laboratories, known as Advil, and also sold as Nuprin.

Adams retired as Head of Pharmacological Sciences at Boots in 1983. For ibuprofen, Boots received the Queen's Award for Technological Achievement in 1985.

== Recognition ==
=== Inventors Hall of Fame ===
In 2022, Adams was inducted into the National Inventors Hall of Fame.

=== Blue plaques ===
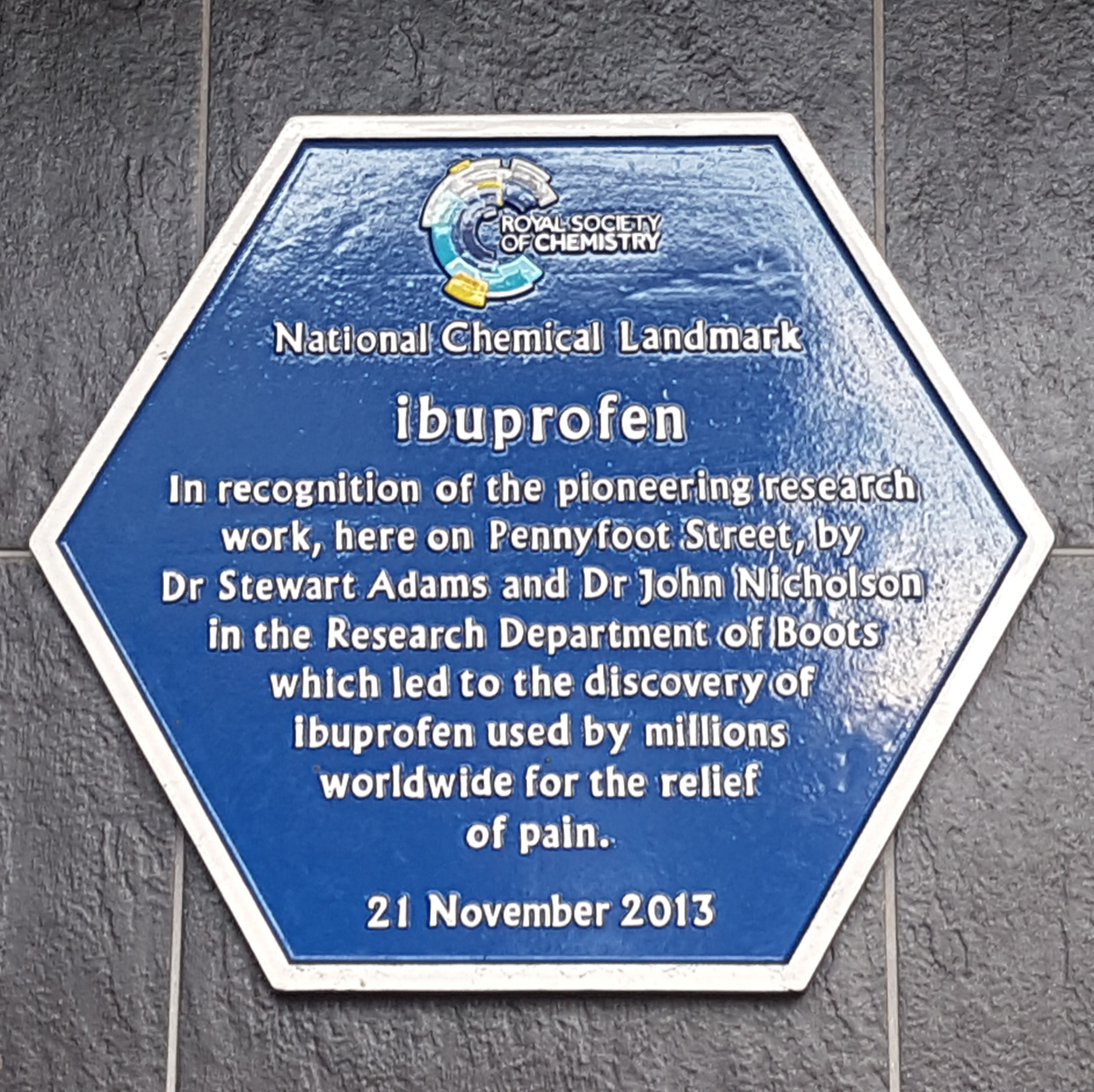
The Royal Society of Chemistry blue plaque at BioCity Nottingham

In November 2013 work on ibuprofen was recognised by the erection of a Royal Society of Chemistry blue plaque at Boots' Beeston Factory site in Nottingham, which reads:

In recognition of the work during the 1980s by The Boots Company PLC on the development of ibuprofen which resulted in its move from prescription only status to over the counter sale, therefore expanding its use to millions of people worldwide

and another at BioCity Nottingham, the site of the original laboratory, which reads:

In recognition of the pioneering research work, here on Pennyfood Street, by Dr Stewart Adams and Dr John Nicholson in the Research Department of Boots which led to the discovery of ibuprofen used by millions worldwide for the relief of pain.

=== Dr Stewart Adams Bridge ===
A new pedestrian and cycle bridge connecting the Nottingham Science Park to the Boots head office campus, over the Midland Main Line, was named after Adams, as part of the electrification works.

== Personal life ==
He married Mary, a teacher, in 1950, just before he moved to Leeds where he was introduced to Rugby league. He lived in Redhill, Nottinghamshire, in the house he moved into in 1955, in the north of Nottingham. He became a Freeman of the City of Nottingham in 2013. Adams was appointed an Officer of the Order of the British Empire (OBE) in the 1987 New Year Honours.

Adams died aged 95 at the Queen's Medical Centre on 30 January 2019.

== See also ==
- Sir John Vane FRS, the first to discover how aspirin worked
- Nottingham University School of Pharmacy
- List of largest selling pharmaceutical products
