= Ralph Batchelor =

British biochemist and businessman (1931–2021)

- Born: Frank Ralph Batchelor; 24 November 1931
- Died: 24 March 2021 (aged 89); Portsmouth, England
- Other name: Ralph Batchelor
- Education: Peterhouse, Cambridge
- Occupations: Research biochemist; Company director
- Employer: Beecham Pharmaceuticals
- Spouse: Doreen Marjorie Simpson
- Children: Jane Louise; Stephen James; Edward Tobias
- Awards: Addingham Medal; Mullard Medal

Frank Ralph Batchelor (24 November 1931 – 24 March 2021), known as Ralph, was a British biochemist and businessman.

Batchelor attended Collyer's School, Horsham. After studying there for seven years he gained an open scholarship in science to Peterhouse, Cambridge, where he took a BA in biochemistry.

He obtained a research post at Beecham Research Laboratories, in Betchworth in 1956. During his first year with the company, he was sent to work at the Istituto Superiore di Sanità in Rome, under Professor Sir Ernst Chain.

Along with Peter Doyle, George Rolinson and John Nayler, he was part of the team at Betchworth that discovered and synthesised new penicillins. A Royal Society of Chemistry blue plaque now marks this discovery.

In 1970 he was given a managerial position. From 1978 he was a Director of Beecham Pharmaceuticals, retiring in 1989.

He received the Addingham Medal by the City of Leeds in 1966 and the Royal Society's Mullard Medal in 1971, with others, "in recognition of their contributions to the development of the semisynthetic penicillins".

His notebook, including early chromatograms showing the presence of 6-APA, are in the collection of the Science Museum in London.

== Notable works ==
- Batchelor, F. R.; Doyle, F. P.; Nayler, J. H. C.; Rolinson, G. N. (1959). "Syntheses of penicillin: 6-aminopenicillanic acid in penicillin fermentations". Nature. 183: 257–258.
