= Unilever Research & Development Port Sunlight Laboratory =

Unilever research and development facility in England

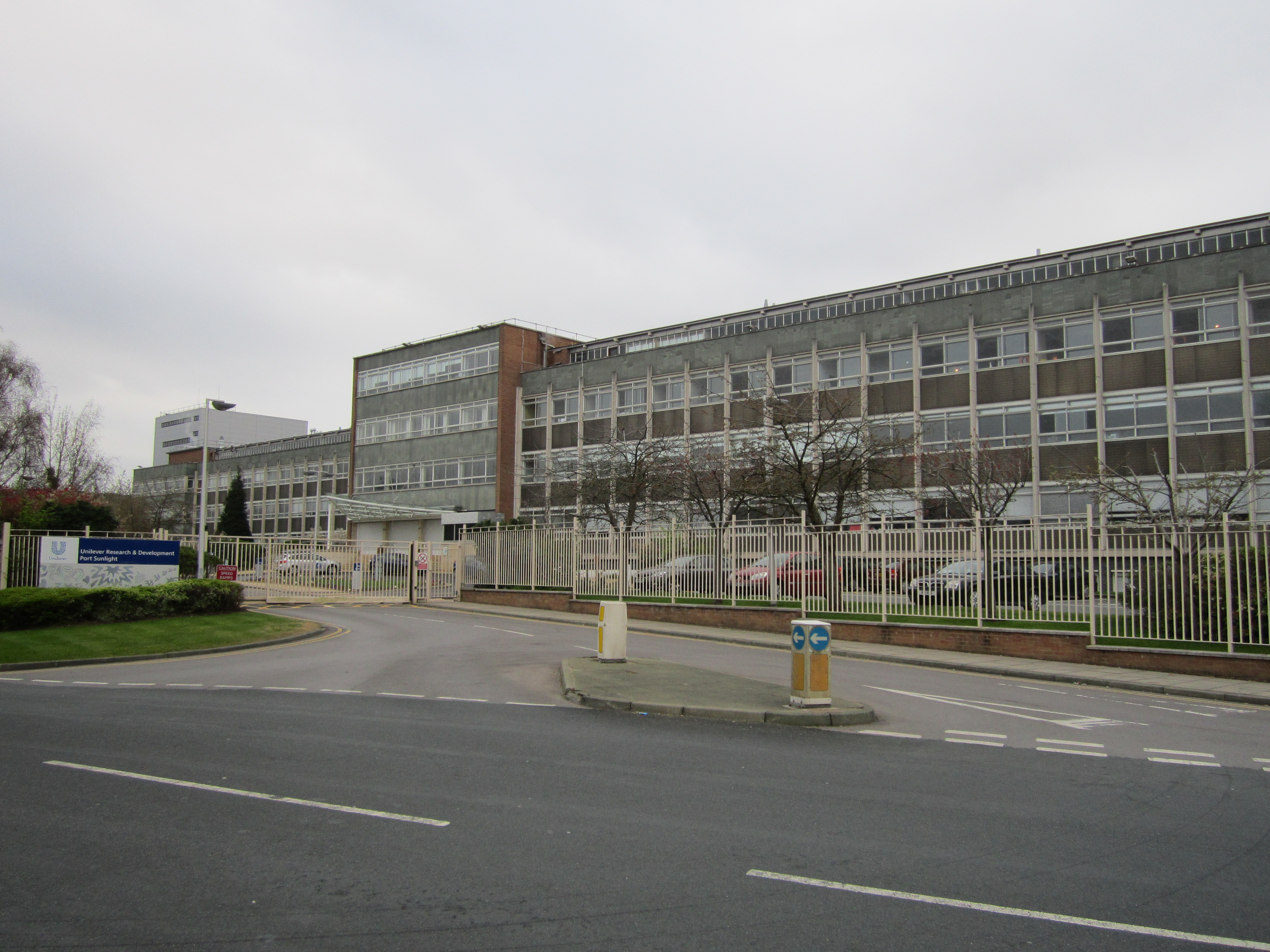
- View from the east

- Location within Merseyside
- Former names: Port Sunlight Research Laboratory
- Alternative names: R&D Port Sunlight

General information
- Type: Research
- Location: Bebington, Bromborough Road, Wirral, CH63 3JW, England
- Coordinates: 53.346°N 2.998°W
- Elevation: 20 m (66 ft)
- Cost: £3 million
- Client: Unilever Research
- Owner: Unilever

Website
- Unilever

The Unilever Research & Development Port Sunlight Laboratory is the multinational consumer goods company Unilever's main research and development facility in the United Kingdom. It is located in Bebington, Merseyside.

== History ==
Unilever's predecessor companies conducted research in Bebington from 1890 and the first dedicated research building was built in 1911 by Lever Brothers. Unilever was formed in 1929, and until 1951 Port Sunlight was its main research laboratory worldwide.

=== 1920s ===
In the 1920s the former site researched vitamin A and D in margarine.

=== 1960s ===
It created a research division in 1961. In the early 1960s the site researched colloid chemistry, surface active phenomena, rheology of dispersions, surface chemistry, fluorescence of dyestuffs, adsorbed films on liquids, germicides, timber technology (for West Africa), and paper chromatography. Organic chemists, physical chemists and physicists worked there. In the 1960s the site was run by Unilever Research. In 1964, newly-employed scientists would be earning £1,450. New buildings in the mid-1960s meant more staff.

In early 1963, 40 scientists working on margarine and edible oils, moved to the company's new site at Welwyn in Hertfordshire.

In the 1960s it had strong family links with both Wirral Grammar School for Boys, and the associated girls' grammar school.

In 1965 the site installed an IBM System/360 (128k storage) computer at Port Sunlight, connected with time-sharing to IBM 1050 consoles at other sites; it claimed to be the first time such a computer system had been installed in the UK for industrial research, and that networked across the country.

In February 1964, planning permission was applied for a site at Spital, on Port Sunlight golf course. By 1964 the site had an IBM 1620 computer. In 1965 the site formed an Operational Research Section at Port Sunlight, and their computers used PL/I and Fortran IV. In 1967 statisticians used control charts, timeseries analysis, multivariate analysis and stochastic processes. From early 1969 the consoles at the site were IBM 2780 with the MFT2 and HASPII operating systems. By 1969, new laboratories were built.

=== 1970s ===
In 1976, Dr Gordon Tiddy of Unilever studied lyotropic liquid crystals with the University of Leeds Chemistry department. In 1978, the site carried out inelastic electron tunnelling spectroscopy with Leicester Polytechnic on an SRC CASE studentship. In 1979 their statistical computer packages were NAG, and GLIM 1–3.

In the 1970s scientists at Port Sunlight discovered tetraacetylethylenediamine (TAED), which allows clothes to be washed at lower temperatures.

By the 1970s, Unilever was also the UK's largest food processing company, and the world's second-largest company, outside the US.

=== 1980s ===
In 1981 the site conducted work with the University of Oxford, involving free radicals, spin trapping and redox-active enzymes with Dr (later Professor) Allen Hill. In 1987 it conducted fluorescence-coupled surface plasmon resonance research with Durham University Department of Physics.

=== 2010s ===
In 2017, Anglo-Dutch Unilever opened a £24m Advanced Manufacturing Centre, built by BAM Construction (owned by the Dutch Royal BAM Group), at the site, with a Materials Innovation Factory at the University of Liverpool, helped by the Regional Growth Fund.

== Construction ==
Construction of the new £3m centre began in summer 1967. Staff moved in from March 1969.

It was officially opened on Monday 20 July 1970 by Sir Eric Rideal. The gross floor area of the research centre was 207,000 sq ft. Including ancillary buildings it was 350,000 sq ft.

The next door £40m Manufacturing Technology Centre was built from July 1992, by Tarmac Construction. opening in May 1995; the new site included different types of pilot plants, and the five-storey Powder Technology Pilot Plant.

=== Earlier site ===
The first building was built in 1942, at a cost of £172,000, and with enlargements it was 160,000 sq ft by the early 1960s. A £270,000 extension, adding 27,000 sq ft was started in January 1963. As part of the extension, a 250-seat demonstration theatre was added, with a revolving stage, for research conferences. The site had around 150 scientists and about 200 assistants.

== Broadcasting ==
The site was featured in 1984 on the BBC 'Science Topics' educational series for schools, with photochemist Stuart Beavan, and luminescent substances in optical brightening agents, viewed in UV light. 35 year old Stuart William Beavan, of Bidston, was killed at 5pm on Saturday July 12 1986 when his Ford Escort collided with another vehicle driven by a 49 year old from Wolverhampton. He had fallen asleep at the wheel between Cerrigydrudion and Betws-y-Coed on the A5.

The site appeared on ITV Schools Science & Technology, on Biotechnology, made by Central Television in 1986, featuring chemist Malcolm Shaw.

== Directors ==
- 1956, GC Hampson, joined in 1945
- November 1961, Sir Kenneth Durham, a former wartime bomber pilot and physicist, who attended the University of Manchester, joining Unilever Research in 1950
- July 1965, Dr Brian Pethica
- December 1984, Richard Duggan, went to the catholic St Edward's College in Liverpool
- February 1988, Dr Roger Platt, went to grammar school in St Helens, joined Lever Brothers in 1971, working on Persil Automatic
- Dr Alan Evenson
- November 2001, Alan McKinnon, joined Port Sunlight in 1980
- Mike Parkington

== Former employees ==
- Unilever chief chemist Sigismund Herschdörfer; he travelled to England in 1935 with his wife Grete Markstein; her son was George Markstein, who grew up in the local area, and who would creat the iconic, and influential, series The Prisoner; Herschdörfer studied Chemistry at the University of Vienna
- Andrew Lang (physicist) FRS, professor of physics from 1979 to 1988 at the University of Bristol (1945-47)
- Steve Rannard, Professor of Chemistry since 2007 at the University of Liverpool (Molecular Science 1998 - 2001)
- Prof David Sherrington FRS, Professor of Polymer Chemistry from 1987 to 2010 at the University of Strathclyde (polymer science 1984-87)
- Dominic Tildesley, Professor of Computational Chemistry from 1996 at Imperial College (head of the Physical Science Group from 1998 to 2012)

== Visits ==
- The Queen and Duke of Edinburgh visited the plant on Thursday 11 July 1957, and met the general manager (Dr G C Hampson) and technical director (L Grimwade) of the research centre.
- Domingo Siazon Jr., director-general of the United Nations Industrial Development Organization, visited on Friday 19 October 1990, after visiting Wirral Council and the North England Inward Investment Agency.
- The £39.2m Manufacturing Technology Centre and £3.4m Environment Centre were opened on Thursday 26 May 1995 by cabinet minister David Hunt, Baron Hunt of Wirral, also the Conservative MP for Wirral West; also attending was Sir Michael Perry, the chairman of Unilever, and Barry Porter, the Conservative MP for Wirral South (whose untimely death the following year, at the age of 57, would eliminate the government's overall majority).
- Xu Kuangdi, the Mayor of Shanghai from 1995 to 2001, visited the site in May 1996, to see the Technology and Environment Centre; the 10-acre Environment Centre investigated water ecotoxicology, from the nearby River Dibbin.
- On Friday 18 February 2000, Queen Margrethe II of Denmark, with the Prince of Wales, flew into Hawarden Airport and visited the Environment Centre.
- The Duke of Kent visited on Wednesday 12 July 2006.

== Research ==
Unilever is the world's third-largest cosmetics company, after L'Oréal and P&G.

=== Collaborations ===
In the 1960s Unilever Research worked with J. D. Bernal of Birkbeck College.

== Structure ==
The site is on the west side of the railway, between Spital railway station, to the south, and Port Sunlight railway station to the north.

== Funding ==
By 1970 its research division had 4,600 scientists with a budget of £32 million (current value £438.9 million), rising to £219 million in 1983 (current value £744.6 million), then £330 million in 1987 (current value £954.6 million). By the end of the 1980s there were around 400 scientists at Port Sunlight.

== Activities ==
Over 750 scientists are currently based at the laboratory. It conducts research for products including Dove, Sunsilk and Domestos.

Unilever operates similar research facilities in Vlaardingen, Colworth, Shanghai, Bangalore and Trumbull. Research was earlier carried out at 455 London Road (A315) in Isleworth from 1950 to 1980, it looked at hair, skin and teeth; this research moved to Bebington at the end of 1980. American research was at Edgewater, New Jersey, where Vincent Lamberti invented Dove soap. The industry is represented by the UK Cleaning Products Industry Association.

Unilever had a defined benefit pension plan up until 2019.

== Gallery ==
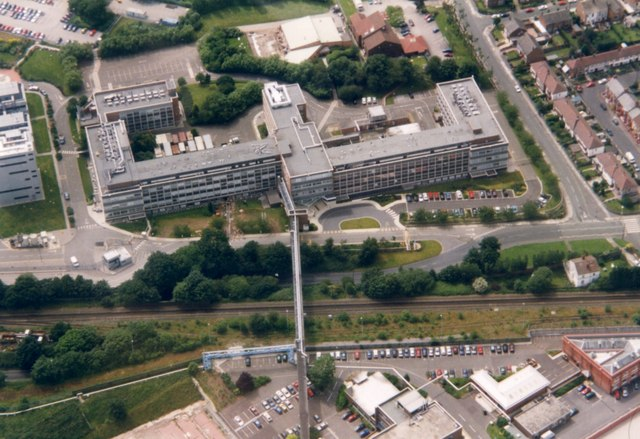
View from above in July 1998

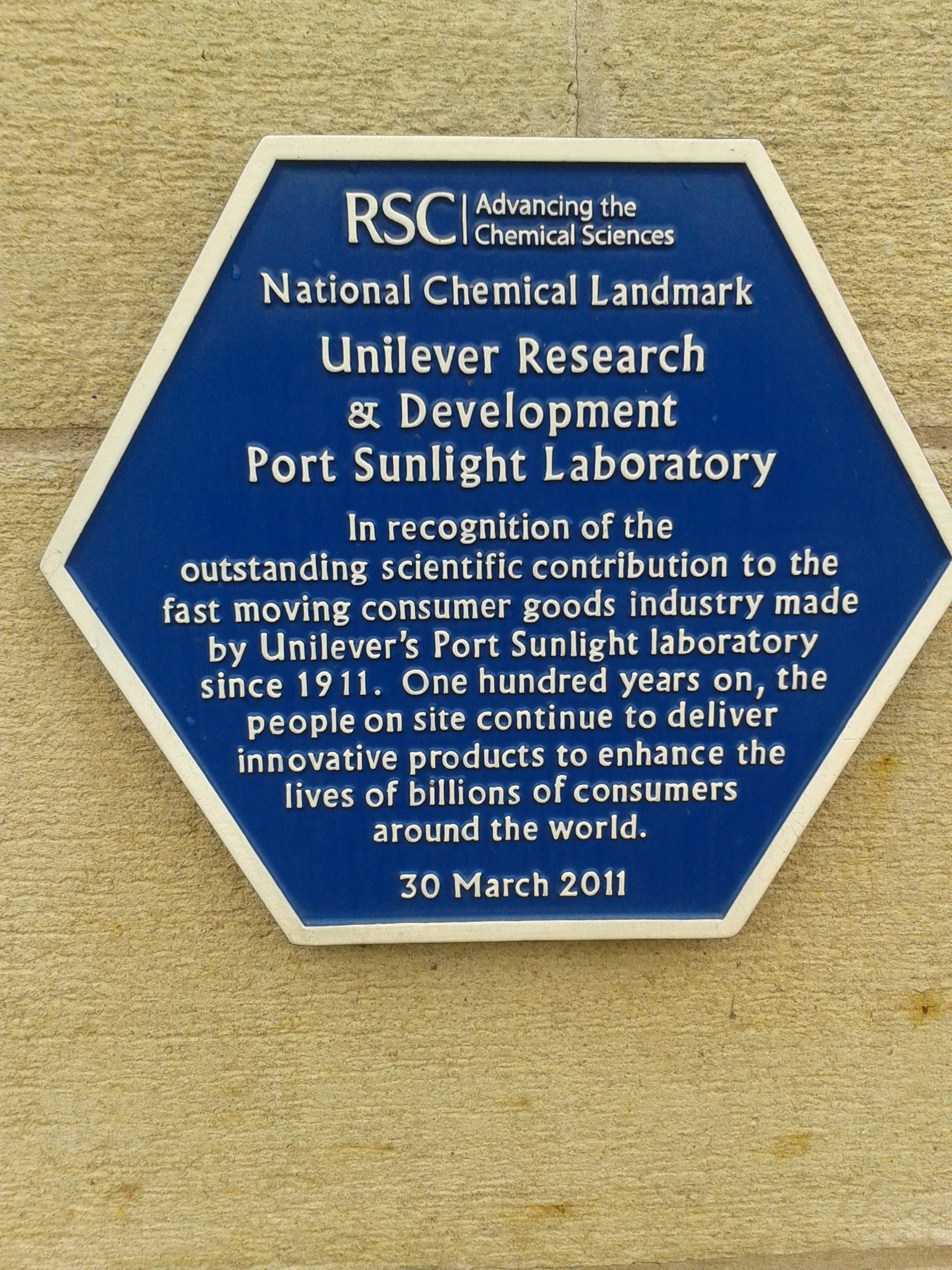
Blue plaque erected by the Royal Society of Chemistry

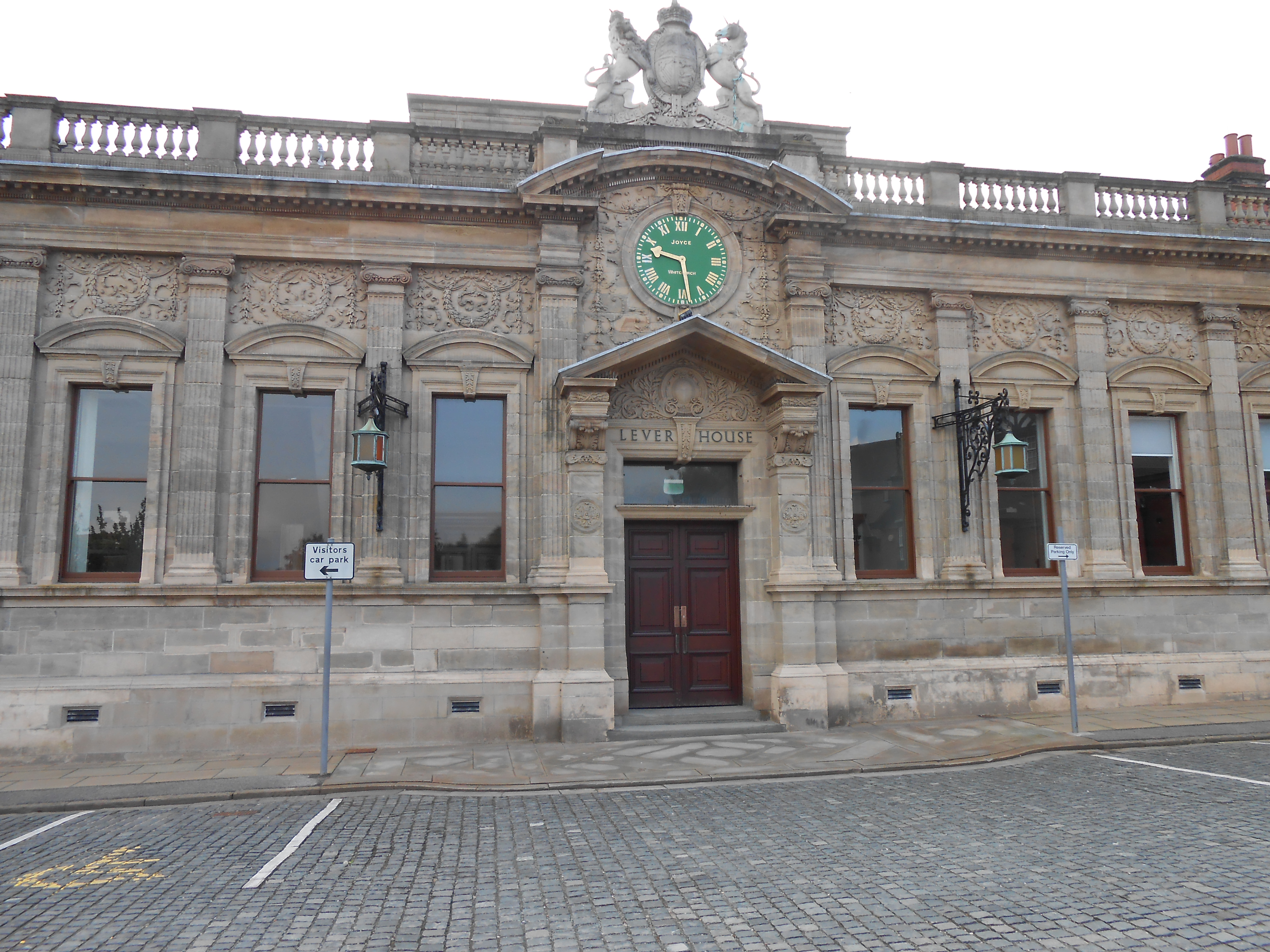
The nearby Lever House

== See also ==
- Newcastle Innovation Centre of P&G, on Whitley Road in Longbenton
- The former British Launderers Research Association, Hill View Gardens, Hendon, founded in 1920
- Institution of British Launderers, a trade body
- Fabric Care Research Association, at Forest House Laboratories, Knaresborough Road in Harrogate, closed as FCRA in 2000, it originated as the Dyers and Cleaners Research Association
- Guild of Cleaners and Launderers, in Larkhall in South Lanarkshire, being formed in 1949
