= 6-APA =

6-Aminopenicillanic acid
- 6-Aminopenicillanic acid

Names
- IUPAC name 6β-Amino-2,2-dimethylpenam-3α-carboxylic acid
- Systematic IUPAC name (2S,5R,6R)-6-Amino-3,3-dimethyl-7-oxo-4-thia-1-azabicyclo[3.2.0]heptane-2-carboxylic acid

Identifiers
CAS Number	551-16-6
3D model (JSmol)	Interactive image
ChEBI	CHEBI:57869
ChemSpider	10611
ECHA InfoCard	100.008.177
EC Number	208-993-4
PubChem CID	11082
UNII	QR0C4R7XVN
CompTox Dashboard (EPA)	DTXSID7046097
- InChI: InChI=1S/C8H12N2O3S/c1-8(2)4(7(12)13)10-5(11)3(9)6(10)14-8/h3-4,6H,9H2,1-2H3,(H,12,13)/t3-,4+,6-/m1/s1 Key: NGHVIOIJCVXTGV-ALEPSDHESA-N; InChI=1/C8H12N2O3S/c1-8(2)4(7(12)13)10-5(11)3(9)6(10)14-8/h3-4,6H,9H2,1-2H3,(H,12,13)/t3-,4+,6-/m1/s1 Key: NGHVIOIJCVXTGV-ALEPSDHEBW
- SMILES: O=C(O)[C@@H]1N2C(=O)[C@@H](N)[C@H]2SC1(C)C

Properties
Chemical formula	C_{8}H_{12}N_{2}O_{3}S
Molar mass	216.26 g·mol^{−1}
Appearance	colourless
Melting point	198 °C (388 °F; 471 K)
Solubility in water	0.4 g/100 mL
log P	0.600
- Except where otherwise noted, data are given for materials in their standard state (at 25 °C [77 °F], 100 kPa). verify (what is ?) Infobox references

6-APA ((+)-6-aminopenicillanic acid) is an organic compound that is used in the synthesis of β–lactam antibiotics including amoxicillin, ampicillin, oxacillin, and carbenicillin. The major commercial source of 6-APA is natural penicillin G, which contains an N-phenylacetyl substituent.

The semi-synthetic penicillins derived from 6-APA are also referred to as penicillins and are considered part of the penicillin family of antibiotics.

== History ==
In 1958, Beecham scientists from Brockham Park, Surrey, found a way to obtain 6-APA from penicillin. Other β-lactam antibiotics could then be synthesized by attaching various side-chains to the nucleus. The reason why this was achieved so many years after the commercial development of penicillin by Howard Florey and Ernst Chain lies in the fact that penicillin itself is very susceptible to hydrolysis, so direct replacement of the side-chain was not a practical route to other β-lactam antibiotics.

== See also ==
- Ralph Batchelor
- Peter Doyle
