= David Colin Sherrington =

British polymer chemist (1945–2014)

David Colin Sherrington FRS
- Born: 5 March 1945; Litherland, Liverpool
- Died: 4 October 2014 (aged 69)
- Education: University of Liverpool
- Spouse: Valerie Vinnicombe
- Awards: Fellowship of the Royal Society of Edinburgh (1990); Fellow of the Royal Society (2007)
- Scientific career
- Fields: Polymer chemistry
- Workplaces: University of Liverpool; University of Strathclyde; Unilever’s Port Sunlight laboratory
- Doctoral advisor: Anthony Ledwith

David Colin Sherrington FRS (5 March 1945 – 4 October 2014) was a polymer chemist whose research career was based at the University of Strathclyde.

== Biography ==
David Colin Sherrington was born at Webster Street, Litherland, Liverpool on 5 March 1945, the second child of Alfred George Sherrington, a dock labourer, and Lucy Gladys Sherrington, née Pyke. He attended two primary/junior schools before passing the eleven-plus exam, enabling him to go to Waterloo Grammar School. Crosby. His A-Level results were good enough for him to by-pass the first year of the chemistry degree course at the University of Liverpool and enter the second year in 1963. He graduated first-class in 1966.

Sherrington stayed at Liverpool for his PhD, under Anthony Ledwith, and then continued as a research assistant in the same department so that he could help his recently widowed mother. In 1971 he applied for two fellowships: at Heriot-Watt University and at the University of Strathclyde. He was successful with the second, and took up a post in Alastair M. North’s department of pure and applied chemistry.

Before moving north, David Sherrington married Valerie Vinnicombe at County Road Methodist Church, Walton in June 1972. They had met at the university tennis club, where she was secretary and he was trying to lose weight.

By 1975 his researches in Scotland had become focused on polymer-supported reactions. In 1984 Sherrington accepted a three-year contract at Unilever’s Port Sunlight laboratory under its research director Sir Geoffrey Allen, FRS. His job was to build and lead the Polymer Science Area. He worked in fields that had practical value – always his wish – such as biodegradable polymers and molecular imprinting. Another area he developed was porpos polymers from high internal phase emulsions (PolyHIPEs), particularly as applied to solid phase peptide synthesis.

Sherrington returned to Strathclyde in 1987 as a full professor and later the head of the organic chemistry section. His reputation grew and he was to hold visiting chairs in 10 universities around the world. He was awarded a DSc by his alma mater, and elected a Fellow of the Royal Societies of Edinburgh and London.

In their memoir of Sherrington Randal W. Richards and Philip Hodge note, that “It is very evident that David Sherrington made a major and unique impact on polymer science by enthusiastically bringing the rigour of physical chemistry to a new and rapidly expanding area of the subject and by being keen to collaborate with experts in other Disciplines”.

David Colin Carrington suffered from pain in his lower back for many years, and was finally diagnosed in April 2012 as having multiple system atrophy (MSA). He had two major attacks of pneumonia in 2014 and died on 4 October, survived by Val. They had no children.

Val has continued to raise awareness of MSA.
