= BioCity Nottingham =

Science park in Nottingham, England

Coordinates: 52°57′04″N 1°8′11″W

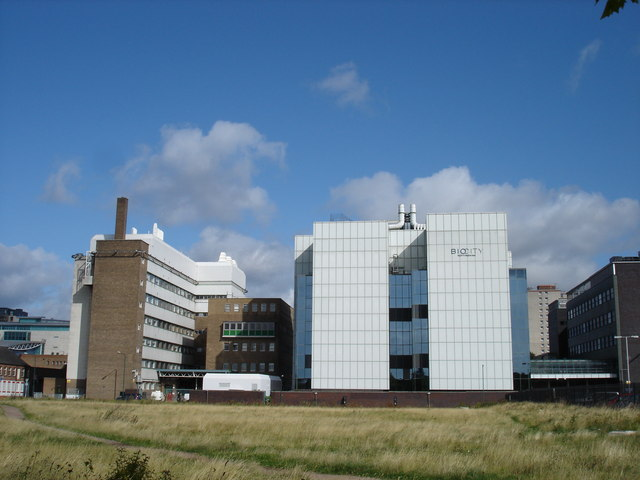
- Biocity buildings
- Formation: September 2003
- Legal status: Science park
- Purpose: Bioscience innovation
- Location: Pennyfoot Street, Nottingham, NG1 1GF
- Region served: UK
- Members: 70 companies
- Chief Executive: Dr Glenn Crocker
- Main organ: BioCity Board (Chairman – Dr Louis Nisbet)
- Affiliations: Nottingham Trent University, University of Nottingham,
- Website: BioCity Nottingham

BioCity Nottingham is a bioscience science park in central Nottingham in the United Kingdom. It is the UK's largest bioscience innovation and incubation centre, now run by Pioneer Group, a specialist life sciences real estate and venture building company.

== History ==
On Sunday 24 April 1983 there was an explosion at the former Boots site.

Due to Flosequinan, known as Manoplax, having commercial difficulties, Boots Pharmaceuticals was bought by Knoll Pharmaceuticals, part of BASF in March 1995, for £840m. Sibutramine was being developed by Boots at the time. 100 research jobs were cut at Beeston, and 165 at the site in October 1995.

On Tuesday 3 September 1996 BASF chairman Jürgen F. Strube visited the Nottingham site. BASF decided to sell the site in April 2000.

In 2002, laboratories and office space were donated to Nottingham Trent University by BASF. Biocity was founded in September 2003 by the University of Nottingham, Nottingham Trent University (NTU) and the East Midlands Development Agency (which was based close to BioCity).

Biocity's premises were developed from the building donated by BASF. Phase 1 was completed in March 2004, providing 36,000 sq ft (3,300 m^{2}) of space, then Phase 2 in March 2006 provided 24,000 sq ft (2,200 m^{2}). When Phase 3 of the development was completed in October 2008, with 45,000 sq ft (4,200 m^{2}), funding from emda also finished.

=== Associated Boots site ===
Boots had an animal testing site at the priory at Thurgarton, the Thurgarton Research Station, in Nottinghamshire from 1947, set up by biochemist Sir Jack Drummond, which Knoll bought, and moved out in April 1996.

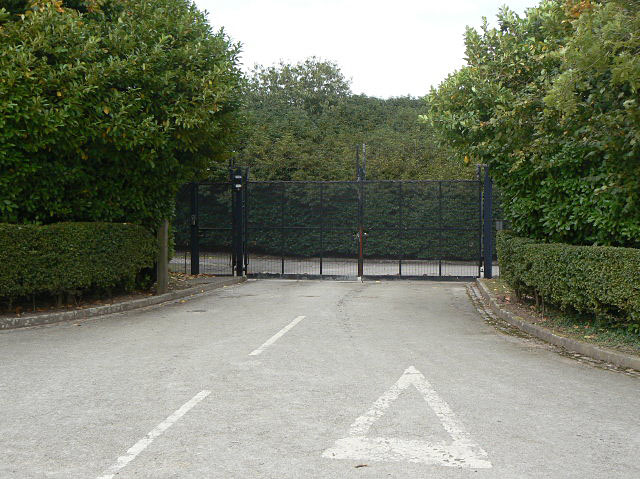
Other former Boots site at Thurgarton

An animal rights organisation, the Boots Action Committee, had protested at both sites. On Sunday 20 June 1982 the ALF entered the Thurgarton site and stole 13 Beagle dogs. In 1984 animal rights protesters had tampered with Boots shampoo products. On Saturday 3 November 1990 a group of the ALF broke into the Thurgarton site and stole eight Beagle dogs. The group appeared at Newark magistrates on Tuesday 13 November 1990. 43 animal rights protesters were arrested at Thurgarton on 12 November 1990, but criminal charges were dropped.

Boots Properties decided to sell the Thurgarton site in August 1997 for £1m.

=== Background ===
Nottingham has a history of bioscience research done at the University of Nottingham, Nottingham Trent University and by Boots, Britain's largest retail pharmacy company, which is based in Dunkirk/Beeston.

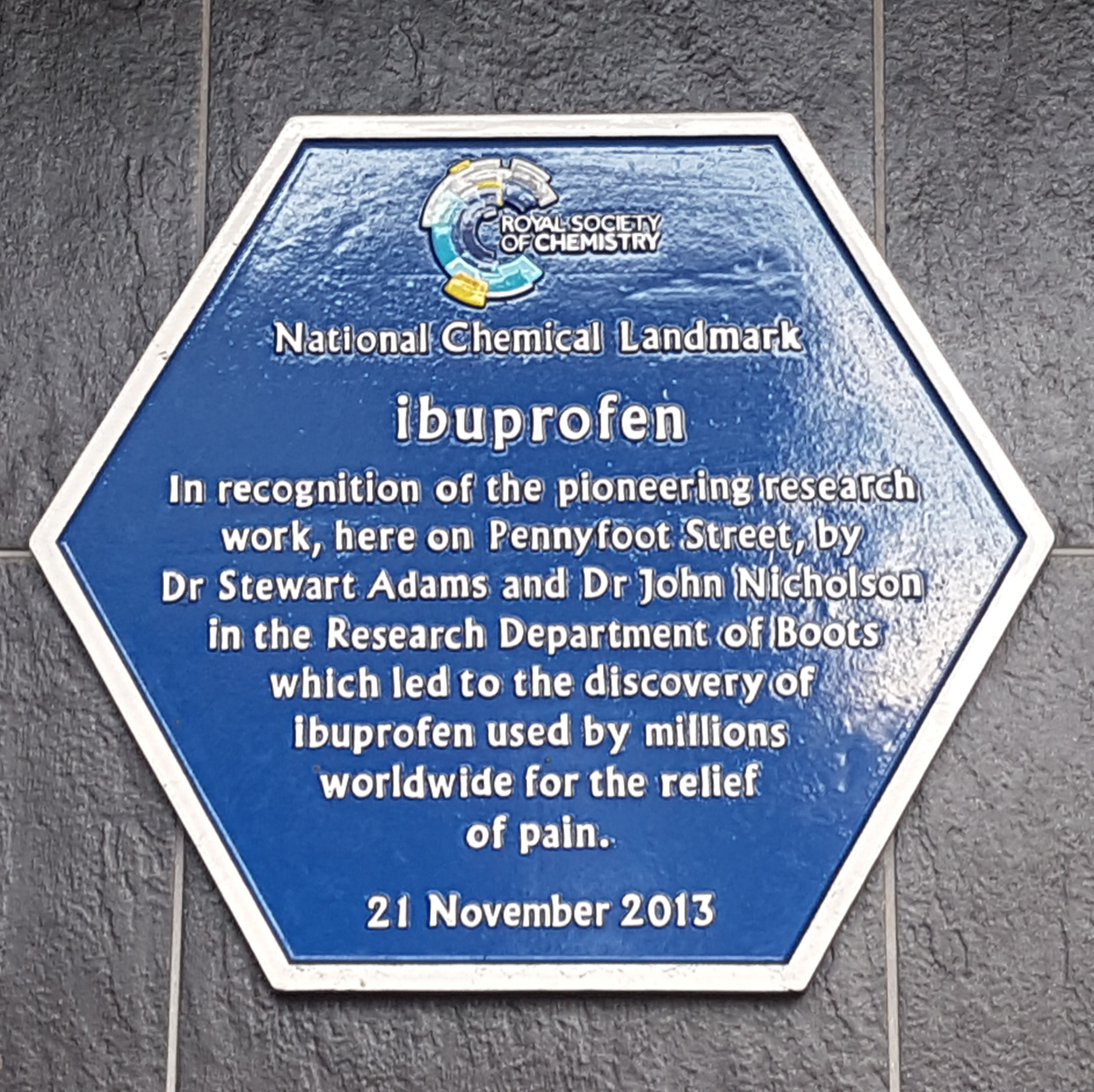
The Royal Society of Chemistry blue plaque at BioCity

Although Boots no longer engages in drug discovery, Ibuprofen (iso-butyl-propanoic-phenolic acid) was created by a team of Boots scientists including Stewart Adams and John Nicholson. In November 2013 work on ibuprofen was recognised by the erection of a Royal Society of Chemistry blue plaque on the site of the original laboratory where the painkiller was developed. The plaque reads:

In recognition of the pioneering research work, here on Pennyfoot Street, by Dr Stewart Adams and Dr John Nicholson in the Research Department of Boots which led to the discovery of ibuprofen used by millions worldwide for the relief of pain.

In March 2005 Nottingham was named as a Science City; the other 5 Science Cities were Birmingham, Bristol, York, Newcastle and Manchester.

=== Construction ===
An earlier research site, for antibiotics and fermentation, had been opened in 1956 next to an antibiotics factory of Boots in Beeston.

On Monday 4 April 1955, Boots acquired 3,675 sq ft of land for the research centre for £30,000, from Nottingham City Council.

Construction was underway by November 1957. The £750,000 seven-storey Chemical Sciences Research Laboratory had been built by February 1958, and opened on Tuesday 22 September 1959, with 24 laboratories. The 1959 building was built by William Moss and Sons, of Queens Road in Loughborough. There was no official opening ceremony, with 88,000 sq ft of buildings. It had a 200-seat lecture theatre, and a radioisotope unit. The site was to also research bacteriology.

There was a large stained glass of 16 ft by 14 ft panel in the entrance to the building, designed by Tony Hollaway. There was a 8 ft by 15 ft mural designed by 24 year old Peter Spring, of the Nottingham School of Architecture.

The nearby Trent House, Nottingham began construction around May 1959, to be finished in 1961.

A new £25m block was added in 1985.

In November 1990, Boots unveiled plans to redevelop the nearby area as a business park, with a hotel, to cost £150m on the 18-acre site. The current site of BBC East Midlands was to be a Boots-owned hotel and conference centre.

== Structure ==
It is situated in former BASF buildings, which previously were used by Boots as research laboratories. The site on Pennyfoot Street, between the A60 and A612, is for bioscience SMEs. The University of Nottingham has the largest collaboration with companies at BioCity, with a few having links with NTU.

There are four buildings –

- Innovation Centre Building
- Stewart Adams Building – named after Dr Stewart Adams OBE, who led the team at Boots (with John Nicholson) that discovered Ibuprofen, a non-steroidal anti-inflammatory drug, in 1963
- Laurus Building
- Discovery Building, opened in 2017

In January 2012 BioCity opened a second site, BioCity Scotland, resulting from the acquisition of a former MSD research facility near Glasgow.

=== Heads of research ===
- Eric Edward Cliffe (1932-2020) 1980s, attended Jesus College, Cambridge

== See also ==
- Chesterford Park Research Station, former Fisons site
- Sheffield Bioincubator
- Francis Crick Institute
- Creative Quarter, Nottingham
