= Mullard Award =

Royal Society Mullard Award

- Awarded for: made to individuals whose work has the potential to make a contribution to national prosperity
- Sponsored by: Royal Society; Mullard Limited
- Country: United Kingdom
- First award: 1967
- Website: royalsociety.org/grants-schemes-awards/awards/mullard-award/

The Mullard Award is awarded annually by the Royal Society to a person who has "an outstanding academic record in any field of natural science, engineering or technology and whose contribution is currently making or has the potential to make a contribution to national prosperity in Britain." It was established in 1967, and has been awarded to more people at once than any other Royal Society medal, with five individuals receiving the award in 1970. The award is a silver gilt medal, which comes with a £2,000 prize and a £1,500 grant to be used for travel and attending conferences.

== Mullard medallists ==
| Year | Name | Rationale | Notes |
|---|---|---|---|
| 1967 | George Douglas Hutton Bell | "for his contribution to agricultural production in breeding Proctor barley" | |
| 1968 | Alastair Pilkington | | |
| 1969 | Richard Milroy Clarkson | "for outstanding advances in aircraft project conception which he has made and, in particular, the initiation of the HS 125 aircraft" | |
| 1970 | Stephen William Kenneth Morgan, Stephen Esslemont Woods, John Lumsden, Bennett Gregory Perry and Leslie Jack Derham | | |
| 1971 | Frank Ralph Batchelor, Frank Peter Doyle, John Herbert Charles Naylor and George Newbolt Rolinson | | |
| 1972 | William Robert Boon | | |
| 1973 | Charles William Oatley | | |
| 1974 | Frank Brian Mercer | | |
| 1975 | John Bingham | | |
| 1976 | George Herbert Hutchings | | (Note: Hutchings became the first American to receive the award.) |
| 1977 | Godfrey Newbold Hounsfield | | |
| 1978 | James W. Black | | |
| 1979 | Ernest Martin Ellis and Geoffrey Light Wilde | | |
| 1980 | Edward Penley Abraham | | |
| 1981 | Michael Elliott, Norman Frank James and David Allen Pulman | | |
| 1982 | Martin Francis Wood, John Michael Woodgate and Peter Edward Hanley | | |
| 1983 | John William Fozard and Ralph Spenser Hooper | | |
| 1984 | Clive Marles Sinclair | | |
| 1985 | David Kalderon | | |
| 1986 | John Bedford Stenlake | | |
| 1987 | Michael Alan Ford | | |
| 1988 | Ralph Louis Wain | | |
| 1989 | David Richard Sweatman Hedgeland | | |
| 1990 | Peter Mansfield, John Rowland Mallard and James McDonald Strahan Hutchinson | | |
| 1991 | David Jack and Roy Thomas Brittain | | |
| 1992 | Robert William Ernest Shannon | | |
| 1993 | Allen Hill, Monika Green and Anthony Cass | "in recognition of their to the translation of bioelectrochemical research into the successful launch of molecular sensors for medical use" | |
| 1994 | John White, Brad Amos, Richard Durbin and Michael Fordham | | |
| 1995 | Kenneth Richardson | | |
| 1996 | Ian McKittrick | | |
| 1997 | Patrick Humphrey | | |
| 1998 | Graham Richards | | |
| 1999 | John Rhodes | | |
| 2000 | Martin Sweeting | | |
| 2003 | Henning Sirringhaus | | |
| 2004 | Jeremy Baumberg | | |
| 2005 | Ben G. Davis | | |
| 2007 | Chris Freeman | | |
| 2009 | Shankar Balasubramanian | | |
| 2014 | Demis Hassabis | | |
| 2016 | Steve Furber and Sophie Wilson | "for their distinguished contributions to the design and analysis of the Acorn RISC Machine (ARM) microprocessor in the 1980s, which is now used in mobile phones and other portable electronic devices throughout the world" | |
| 2018 | Florin Udrea and Julian Gardner | | |
| 2019 | Hagan Bayley | | |
| 2020 | Stephen Jackson | | |
| 2021 | Stephen G. Davies | | |
| 2022 | Graeme Milligan | for his global leadership in pharmacological and translational studies, his successful "spinning-out" of academic research and his longstanding underpinning support for the bio-pharmaceutical industry | |
| 2025 | Jason Hallett | for pioneering work on the development of ionic liquids as commercially relevant solvents in biorefining and the circular economy | |

== See also ==
- Lists of science and technology awards
