= Andrew Lang (physicist) =

British scientist (1924-2008)

Andrew Richard Lang FRS
- Born: 9 September 1924; St Annes-on-Sea
- Died: 30 June 2008 (aged 83); Bristol
- Education: University College of the South West
- Known for: X-ray topography
- Awards: See list
- Scientific career
- Fields: Crystallography
- Workplaces: Unilever Research Laboratories, Port Sunlight; The Cavendish Laboratory; Philips Laboratories at Irvington-on-Hudson, New York; Harvard University; University of Bristol
- Thesis: New X-ray counter spectrometer techniques (Written in 1952; PhD awarded 1953)
- Doctoral advisor: W H Taylor (Cavendish Laboratory)

Andrew Richard Lang FRS CBE (9 September 1924 – 30 June 2008) was a British scientist and crystallographer.

== Biography ==
Andrew Lang was the son of Ernest Frederick Stephen Lang, technical engineer with Beyer, Peacock & Company and Susannah C E A Guterbock, a naturalized German citizen.

As a child, he suffered from repeated respiratory infections. Although he was accepted for entry to Trinity College, Cambridge, ill health postponed his start, and he went instead to the University College of the South West, now the University of Exeter, in 1942. He graduated two years later with a first class honours external BSc in physics. In February 1945 he started his war-time ‘essential work’ at Unilever Research Laboratories in Cheshire, where he carried out X-ray crystallography on crystals of pure soaps. In addition, part-time study earned him a London University external MSc in 1947. Later that year he took a one-year position at the Cavendish Laboratory and in 1948 started on a PhD under W H Taylor, working on developing new and improved techniques for X-ray powder diffractometry. He finished writing his PhD thesis in 1952, and immediately sailed on the Caronia in April, bound for the Philips Laboratories at Irvington-on-Hudson, New York, where he continued the study of diffraction techniques.

While in Irvington, Lang received two job offers, one of which was in Harvard. He accepted the position of instructor in the Division of Applied Science, starting in late 1953. The following year he was appointed assistant professor of physical metallurgy in the Division of Engineering and Applied Physics, a post he held until 1959. While at Harvard, Lang developed a technique for observing images of defects in nearly perfect crystals, known as X-ray topography, regarded by many as his most important achievement.

Lang was invited by Charles Frank to join the H H Wills Physics Laboratory at the University of Bristol. He started as a lecturer in 1960, and progressed there for the rest of his career. He was appointed reader in physics in 1962; professor of physics in 1979; professor emeritus in 1988; and senior research fellow in 1995.

Andrew Richard Lang never married. He died in Bristol in 2008.

== Honours and awards ==
- 1944 External BSc in physics, first class honours, University of London
- 1947 External MSc, University of London
- 1953 PhD, University of Cambridge
- 1964 The Charles Vernon Boys Prize of the Institute of Physics and the Physical Society
- 1975 Elected Fellow of the Royal Society
- 1994 Awarded Honorary DSc, University of Exeter
- 1996 Elected Foreign Associate of the Royal Society of South Africa
- 1997 Awarded the Hughes Medal of the Royal Society
- 2002 Awarded honorary life membership, British Crystallographic Association
- 2005 Awarded the Ernst Mach Honorary Medal by the Czech Academy of Sciences

== External positions held ==
- Chairman of the American Crystallographic Association Apparatus and Standards Sub-Committee (1957–1959)
- Consultant, Smithsonian Astrophysical Laboratory (1957–1959)
- Associate editor, Journal of Crystal Growth (1966–1990)
- Member of the UK SERC Synchrotron Radiation Facility Committee (1976–1978)
