= Ibuprofen =

Nonsteroidal anti-inflammatory drug

- (R/S)-ibuprofen

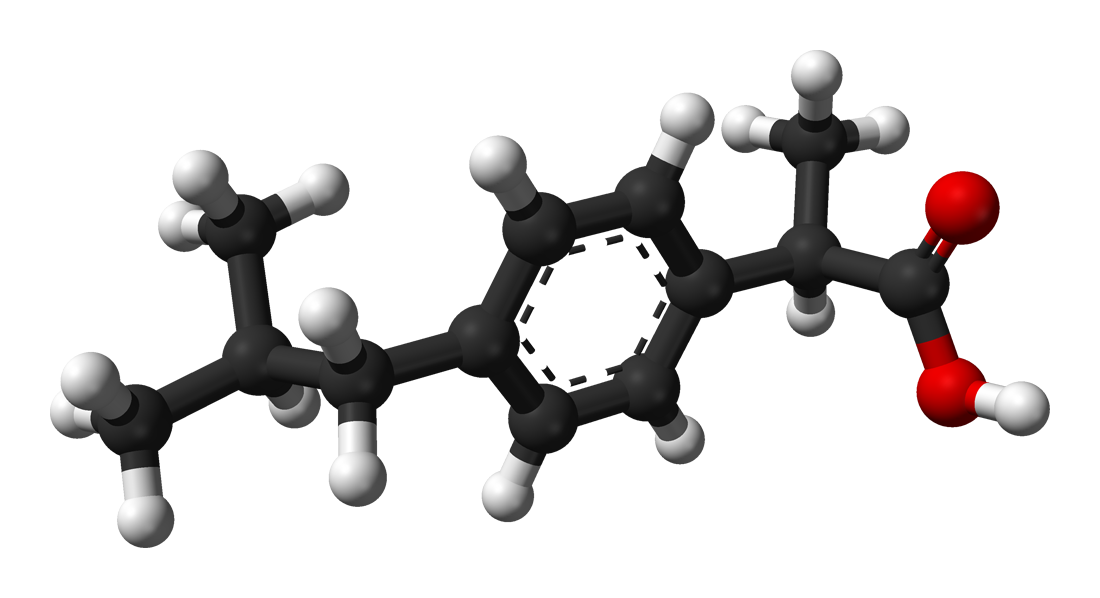
- (R)-ibuprofen

Clinical data
- Pronunciation: /ˈaɪbjuːproʊfɛn/, /aɪbjuːˈproʊfən/, eye-bew-PROH-fən
- Trade names: Brufen, others
- Other names: Isobutylphenylpropionic acid
- AHFS/Drugs.com: Monograph
- MedlinePlus: a682159
- License data: US DailyMed: Ibuprofen
- Pregnancy category: AU: C
- Routes of administration: By mouth, rectal, topical, intravenous
- Drug class: Nonsteroidal anti-inflammatory drug (NSAID)
- ATC code: C01EB16 (WHO) G02CC01 (WHO) M01AE01 (WHO) M02AA13 (WHO) R02AX02 (WHO)

Legal status
- Legal status: AU: OTC; CA: OTC; UK: General sales list (GSL, OTC); US: OTC / Rx-only; EU: OTC

Pharmacokinetic data
- Bioavailability: 80–100% (oral), 87% (rectal)
- Protein binding: 98%
- Metabolism: Liver (CYP2C9)
- Metabolites: Ibuprofen glucuronide, 2-hydroxyibuprofen, 3-hydroxyibuprofen, carboxy-ibuprofen, 1-hydroxyibuprofen
- Onset of action: 30 minutes
- Elimination half-life: 2–4 hours
- Excretion: Urine (95%)

Identifiers
- IUPAC name: (RS)-2-(4-(2-Methylpropyl)phenyl)propanoic acid
- CAS Number: 15687-27-1
- PubChem CID: 3672
- IUPHAR/BPS: 2713
- DrugBank: DB01050
- ChemSpider: 3544
- UNII: WK2XYI10QM
- KEGG: D00126
- ChEBI: CHEBI:5855
- ChEMBL: ChEMBL521
- PDB ligand: IBP (PDBe, RCSB PDB)
- CompTox Dashboard (EPA): DTXSID5020732
- ECHA InfoCard: 100.036.152

Chemical and physical data
- Formula: C_{13}H_{18}O_{2}
- Molar mass: 206.285 g·mol^{−1}
- 3D model (JSmol): Interactive image
- Chirality: Racemic mixture
- Density: 1.03 g/cm^{3}
- Melting point: 75 to 78 °C (167 to 172 °F)
- Boiling point: 157 °C (315 °F) at 4 mmHg
- Solubility in water: 0.021g/L
- SMILES: CC(C)Cc1ccc(cc1)[C@@H](C)C(=O)O
- InChI: InChI=1S/C13H18O2/c1-9(2)8-11-4-6-12(7-5-11)10(3)13(14)15/h4-7,9-10H,8H2,1-3H3,(H,14,15); Key:HEFNNWSXXWATRW-UHFFFAOYSA-N

Ibuprofen is a nonsteroidal anti-inflammatory drug (NSAID) that is used to relieve pain, fever, and inflammation. This includes painful menstrual periods, migraines, and rheumatoid arthritis. It can be taken orally (by mouth) or intravenously (injected into a vein). It typically begins working within an hour.

Common side effects include heartburn, nausea, indigestion, and abdominal pain. Potential side effects include gastrointestinal bleeding. Long-term use has been associated with kidney failure, and rarely liver failure, and it can exacerbate the condition of people with heart failure. At low doses, it does not appear to increase the risk of myocardial infarction (heart attack); however, at higher doses it may. Ibuprofen can also worsen asthma. While its safety in early pregnancy is unclear, it appears to be harmful in later pregnancy, so it is not recommended during that period. It works by inhibiting the production of prostaglandins by decreasing the activity of the enzyme cyclooxygenase (COX). Ibuprofen is a weaker anti-inflammatory agent than other NSAIDs.

Ibuprofen was discovered in 1961 in Nottingham by Stewart Adams and John Nicholson while working at Boots the Chemists, and initially sold as Brufen. It is available under a number of brand names including Advil, Brufen, Motrin, and Nurofen. Ibuprofen was first sold in 1969 in the United Kingdom and in 1974 in the United States. It is on the World Health Organization's List of Essential Medicines. It is available as a generic medication. In 2023, it was the 32nd most commonly prescribed medication in the United States, with more than 17 million prescriptions.

== Medical uses ==
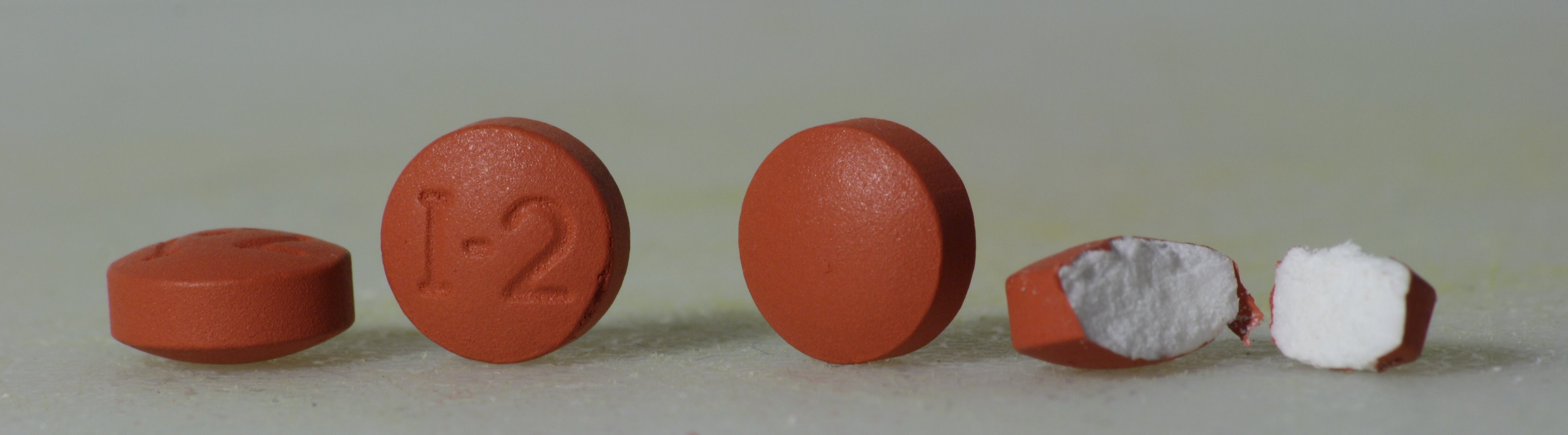
Example of some 200 mg ibuprofen tablets

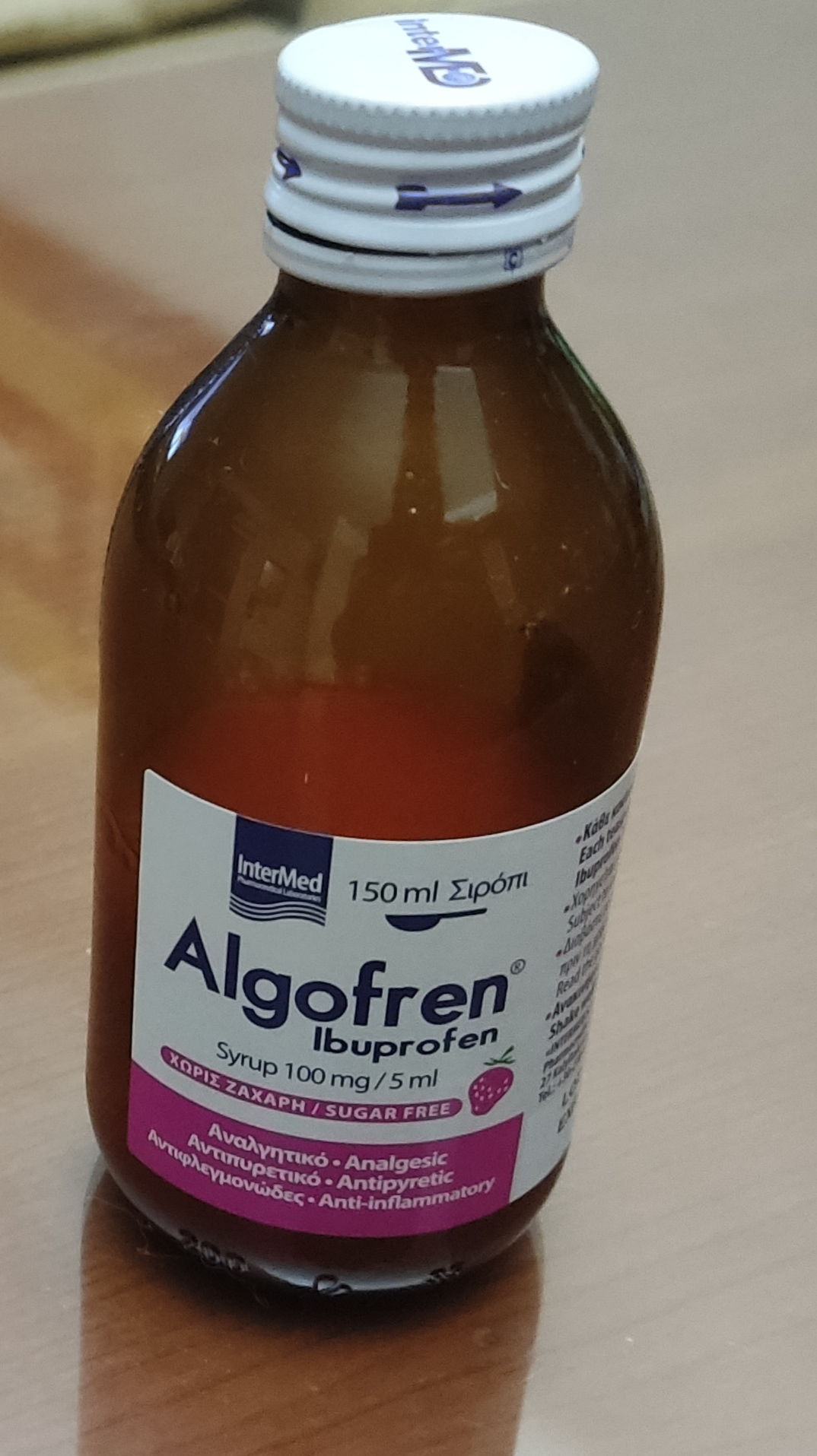
A 150 ml bottle (100 mg/5 ml dosage) of ibuprofen, sold in Greece

Ibuprofen is used primarily to treat fever (including post-vaccination fever), mild to moderate pain (including pain relief after surgery), painful menstruation, osteoarthritis, dental pain, headaches, and pain from kidney stones. About 60% of people respond to any NSAID; those who do not respond well to a particular one may respond to another. A Cochrane medical review of 51 trials of NSAIDs for the treatment of lower back pain found that "NSAIDs are effective for short-term symptomatic relief in patients with acute low back pain".

It is used for inflammatory diseases such as juvenile idiopathic arthritis and rheumatoid arthritis. It is also used for pericarditis and to close a patent ductus arteriosus in a premature baby.

=== Ibuprofen lysine ===
In some countries, ibuprofen lysine (the lysine salt of ibuprofen, sometimes called "ibuprofen lysinate") is licensed for treatment of the same conditions as ibuprofen; the lysine salt is used because it is more water-soluble. However, subsequent studies have shown no statistical differences between the lysine salt and standalone ibuprofen.

In 2006, ibuprofen lysine was approved in the United States by the Food and Drug Administration (FDA) for closure of patent ductus arteriosus in premature infants weighing between 500 and 1,500 g (1 and 3 lb), who are no more than 32 weeks gestational age when usual medical management (such as fluid restriction, diuretics, and respiratory support) is not effective.

== Adverse effects ==
Adverse effects include nausea, heartburn, indigestion, diarrhea, constipation, gastrointestinal ulceration, headache, dizziness, rash, salt and fluid retention, and high blood pressure.

Infrequent adverse effects include esophageal ulceration, heart failure, high blood levels of potassium, kidney impairment, confusion, and bronchospasm. Ibuprofen can exacerbate asthma, sometimes fatally.

Allergic reactions, including anaphylaxis, may occur. Ibuprofen may be quantified in blood, plasma, or serum to demonstrate the presence of the drug in a person having experienced an anaphylactic reaction, confirm a diagnosis of poisoning in people who are hospitalized, or assist in a medicolegal death investigation. A monograph relating ibuprofen plasma concentration, time since ingestion, and risk of developing renal toxicity in people who have overdosed has been published.

In October 2020, the US Food and Drug Administration (FDA) required the prescribing information to be updated for all NSAID medications to describe the risk of kidney problems in unborn babies that result in low amniotic fluid.

=== Cardiovascular risk ===
Along with several other NSAIDs, chronic ibuprofen use is correlated with the risk of progression to hypertension in women, though less than for paracetamol (acetaminophen), and myocardial infarction (heart attack), particularly among those chronically using higher doses. On 9 July 2015, the FDA toughened warnings of increased heart attack and stroke risk associated with ibuprofen and related NSAIDs; the NSAID aspirin is not included in this warning. The European Medicines Agency (EMA) issued similar warnings in 2015.

=== Skin ===
Along with other NSAIDs, ibuprofen has been associated with the onset of bullous pemphigoid or pemphigoid-like blistering. As with other NSAIDs, ibuprofen has been reported to be a photosensitizing agent, but it is considered a weak photosensitizing agent compared to other members of the 2-arylpropionic acid class. Like other NSAIDs, ibuprofen is an extremely rare cause of the autoimmune diseases Stevens–Johnson syndrome (SJS) and toxic epidermal necrolysis.

=== Pregnancy ===
The National Health Service recommends against the use of ibuprofen for more than 3 days in pregnancy as it can affect the fetus's kidneys and circulatory system. Paracetamol is considered a safer alternative.

A 2012 Canadian study of pregnant women suggested that those taking any type or amount of NSAIDs (including ibuprofen, diclofenac, and naproxen) were 2.4 times more likely to miscarry than those not taking the medications. However, a 2014 Israeli study found no increased risk of miscarriage in the group of mothers using NSAIDs and noted that two previous studies, including the 2012 Canadian study, "did not adjust for important known risk factors" which may have exposed those results to residual confounding.

=== Interactions ===
==== Alcohol ====
Drinking alcohol when taking ibuprofen may increase the risk of stomach bleeding.

==== Aspirin ====
According to the FDA, "ibuprofen can interfere with the antiplatelet effect of low-dose aspirin, potentially rendering aspirin less effective when used for cardioprotection and stroke prevention". Allowing sufficient time between doses of ibuprofen and immediate-release (IR) aspirin can avoid this problem. The recommended elapsed time between a dose of ibuprofen and a dose of aspirin depends on which is taken first. It would be 30 minutes or more for ibuprofen taken after IR aspirin, and 8 hours or more for ibuprofen taken before IR aspirin. However, this timing cannot be recommended for enteric-coated aspirin. If ibuprofen is taken only occasionally without the recommended timing, though, the reduction of the cardioprotection and stroke prevention of a daily aspirin regimen is minimal.

==== Paracetamol (acetaminophen) ====
Ibuprofen combined with paracetamol is considered generally safe in children for short-term usage.

=== Overdose ===
Ibuprofen overdose has become common since it was licensed for over-the-counter (OTC) use. Many overdose experiences are reported in the medical literature, although the frequency of life-threatening complications from ibuprofen overdose is low. Human responses in cases of overdose range from an absence of symptoms to a fatal outcome despite intensive-care treatment. Most symptoms are an excess of the pharmacological action of ibuprofen and include abdominal pain, nausea, vomiting, drowsiness, dizziness, headache, ear ringing, and nystagmus.

Rarely, more severe symptoms such as gastrointestinal bleeding, seizures, metabolic acidosis, hyperkalemia, low blood pressure, slow heart rate, fast heart rate, atrial fibrillation, coma, liver dysfunction, acute kidney failure, cyanosis, respiratory depression, and cardiac arrest have been reported. The severity of symptoms varies with the ingested dose and the time elapsed; however, individual sensitivity also plays an important role. Generally, the symptoms observed with an overdose of ibuprofen are similar to the symptoms caused by overdoses of other NSAIDs.

The correlation between the severity of symptoms and measured ibuprofen plasma levels is weak. Toxic effects are unlikely at doses below 100 mg/kg, but can be severe above 400 mg/kg (around 150 tablets of 200 mg units for an average adult male); however, large doses do not indicate the clinical course is likely to be lethal. A precise lethal dose is difficult to determine, as it may vary with age, weight, and concomitant conditions of the person.

Treatment to address an ibuprofen overdose is based on how the symptoms present. In cases presenting early, decontamination of the stomach is recommended. This is achieved using activated charcoal; charcoal absorbs the drug before it can enter the bloodstream. Gastric lavage is now rarely used, but can be considered if the amount ingested is potentially life-threatening, and it can be performed within 60 minutes of ingestion. Purposeful vomiting is not recommended. Most ibuprofen ingestions produce only mild effects, and the management of overdose is straightforward. Standard measures to maintain normal urine output should be instituted and kidney function monitored. Since ibuprofen has acidic properties and is also excreted in the urine, forced alkaline diuresis is theoretically beneficial. However, because ibuprofen is highly protein-bound in the blood, the kidneys' excretion of the unchanged drug is minimal. Forced alkaline diuresis is, therefore, of limited benefit.

== Pharmacology ==
Ibuprofen works by inhibiting cyclooxygenase (COX) enzymes, which convert arachidonic acid to prostaglandin H2 (PGH_{2}). PGH_{2}, in turn, is converted by other enzymes into various prostaglandins (which mediate pain, inflammation, and fever) and thromboxane A2 (which stimulates platelet aggregation and promotes blood clot formation).

Like aspirin and indomethacin, ibuprofen is a nonselective COX inhibitor, in that it inhibits two isoforms of cyclooxygenase, COX-1 and COX-2. The analgesic, antipyretic, and anti-inflammatory activity of NSAIDs appears to operate mainly through inhibition of COX-2, which decreases the synthesis of prostaglandins involved in mediating inflammation, pain, fever, and swelling. Antipyretic effects may be due to action on the hypothalamus, resulting in an increased peripheral blood flow, vasodilation, and subsequent heat dissipation. Inhibition of COX-1 instead would be responsible for unwanted effects on the gastrointestinal tract. However, the role of the individual COX isoforms in the analgesic, anti-inflammatory, and gastric damage effects of NSAIDs is uncertain, and different compounds cause different degrees of analgesia and gastric damage.

IC_{50} of ibuprofen
Enzyme	IC_{50} [μM]
COX-1	13
COX-2	370

Ibuprofen is administered as a racemic mixture. The R-enantiomer undergoes extensive interconversion to the S-enantiomer in vivo. The S-enantiomer is believed to be the more pharmacologically active enantiomer. The R-enantiomer is converted through a series of three main enzymes. These enzymes include acyl-CoA-synthetase, which converts the R-enantiomer to (−)-R-ibuprofen I-CoA; 2-arylpropionyl-CoA epimerase, which converts (−)-R-ibuprofen I-CoA to (+)-S-ibuprofen I-CoA; and hydrolase, which converts (+)-S-ibuprofen I-CoA to the S-enantiomer. In addition to the conversion of ibuprofen to the S-enantiomer, the body can metabolize ibuprofen to several other compounds, including numerous hydroxyl, carboxyl and glucuronyl metabolites. Virtually all of these have no pharmacological effects.

Unlike most other NSAIDs, ibuprofen also acts as an inhibitor of Rho kinase and may be useful in recovery from spinal cord injury. Another unusual activity is inhibition of the sweet taste receptor.

=== Pharmacokinetics ===
After oral administration, peak serum concentration is reached after 1–2 hours, and up to 99% of the drug is bound to plasma proteins. The majority of ibuprofen is metabolized and eliminated within 24 hours in the urine; however, 1% of the unchanged drug is removed through biliary excretion.

=== Metabolism ===
Ibuprofen mainly undergoes hepatic metabolism. The following table shows potential pathways of ibuprofen metabolism. Both hydroxymetabolites and carboxyl-ibuprofen are inactive.

Hepatic metabolism of ibuprofen
Drug substrate	Other substrates	Enzymes	Products	Side products
ibuprofen	n/d	n/d	1-hydroxyibuprofen	
ibuprofen	oxygen, protons, NADPH	CYP3A4, CYP2C19, CYP2C8, CYP2C9	2-hydroxyibuprofen	NADP, water
ibuprofen	oxygen, protons, NADPH	CYP2C8, CYP2C9, CYP2C19	3-hydroxyibuprofen	NADP, water
3-hydroxyibuprofen	water, oxygen	CYP2C9	carboxyl-ibuprofen	hydrogen peroxide
ibuprofen	uridine diphosphate glucuronic acid	UDP-glucuronosyltransferase (1-1, 1-3, 1-9, 1-10, 2B4, 2B7)	ibuprofen glucuronide	uridine 5'-diphosphate

== Chemistry ==
Ibuprofen is practically insoluble in water, but very soluble in most organic solvents like ethanol (66.18 g/100 mL at 40 °C for 90% EtOH), methanol, acetone and dichloromethane.

The original synthesis of ibuprofen by Boots started with the compound isobutylbenzene. The synthesis took six steps. Firstly, isobutylbenzene undergoes Friedel-Crafts acylation with acetic anhydride, yielding p-isobutylphenyl methyl ketone. Then, through Darzens reaction with ethyl chloroacetate, a α,β-epoxyester is obtained. Then, in an acidic environment, it undergoes decarboxylation and hydrolysis, yielding an aldehyde bearing one more carbon atom than the initial ketone. Then, it goes through a reaction with hydroxylamine, yielding a corresponding oxime. Later, it is converted into a nitrile and hydrolyzed into ibuprofen.

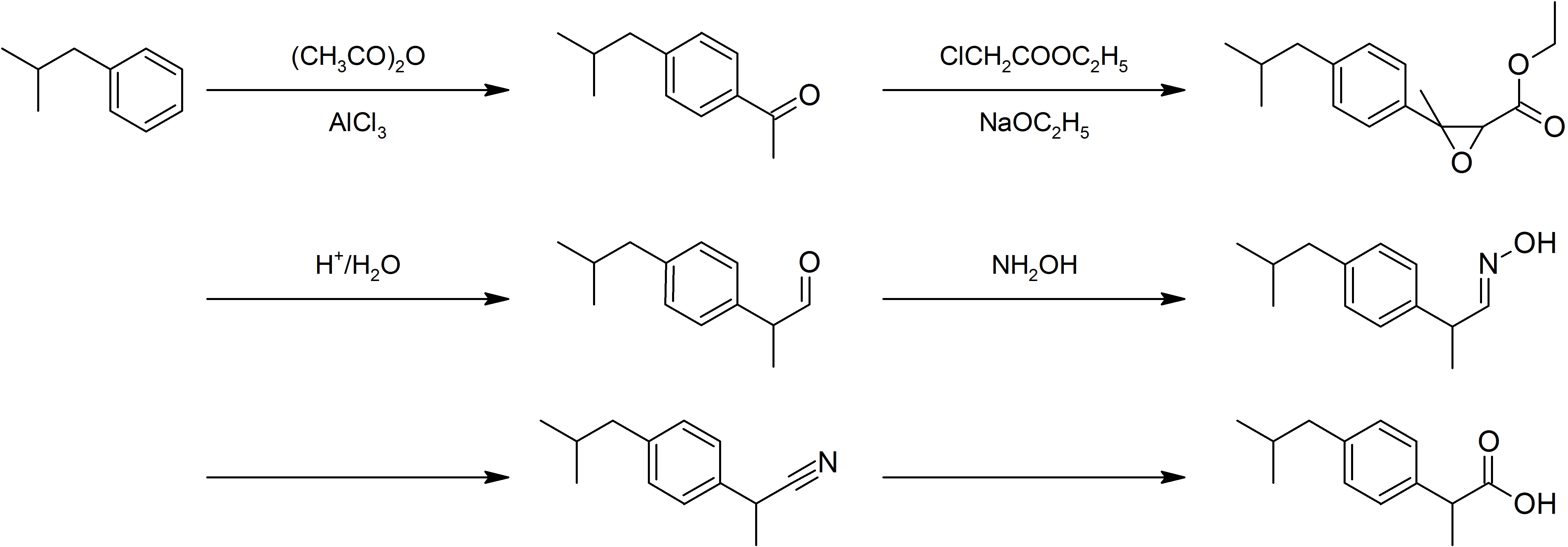
Boots synthesis of ibuprofen

A modern, greener technique with fewer waste byproducts (23% of total product mass vs. 60% theoretical value) for the synthesis involves only three steps and was developed in the 1980s by the Celanese Chemical Company. The synthesis is initiated with the acylation of isobutylbenzene using the recyclable Lewis acid catalyst hydrogen fluoride. The following catalytic hydrogenation of isobutylacetophenone is performed with either Raney nickel or palladium on carbon to lead into the key-step, the carbonylation of 1-(4-isobutylphenyl)ethanol. This is achieved by a PdCl_{2}(PPh_{3})_{2} catalyst, at around 50 bar of CO pressure, in the presence of HCl (10%). The reaction presumably proceeds through the intermediacy of the styrene derivative (acidic elimination of the alcohol) and (1-chloroethyl)benzene derivative (Markovnikow addition of HCl to the double bond).

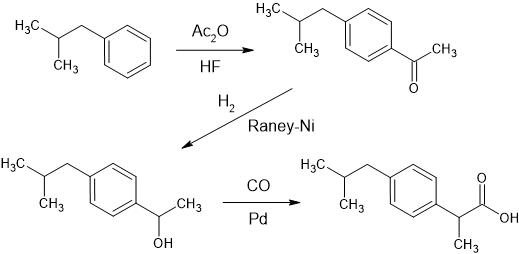
Modern synthesis of ibuprofen

=== Stereochemistry ===
(R)-ibuprofen	(S)-ibuprofen

Ibuprofen, like other 2-arylpropionate derivatives such as ketoprofen, flurbiprofen and naproxen, contains a stereocenter in the α-position of the propionate moiety. The product sold in pharmacies is a racemic mixture of the S and R-isomers. The S (dextrorotatory) isomer is the more biologically active; this isomer has been isolated and used medically as dexibuprofen.

The isomerase enzyme, alpha-methylacyl-CoA racemase, converts (R)-ibuprofen into the (S)-enantiomer.

(S)-ibuprofen, the eutomer, harbors the desired therapeutic activity. The inactive (R)-enantiomer, the distomer, undergoes a unidirectional chiral inversion to offer the active (S)-enantiomer. That is, when the ibuprofen is administered as a racemate the distomer is converted in vivo into the eutomer while the latter is unaffected.

== History ==
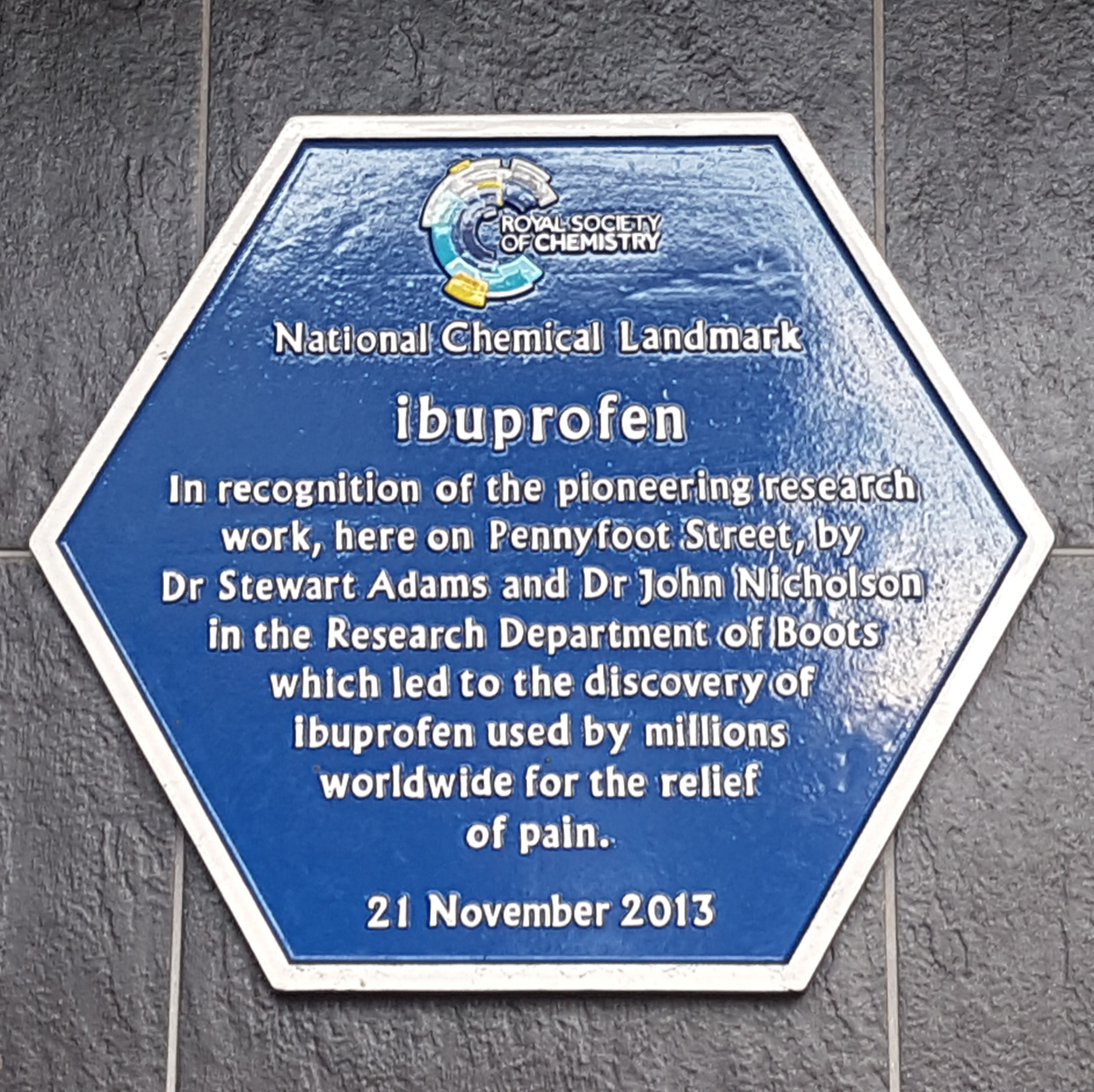
The Royal Society of Chemistry blue plaque at BioCity Nottingham

Ibuprofen was derived from propionic acid by the research arm of Boots during the 1960s. The name is derived from the 3 functional groups: isobutyl (ibu) propionic acid (pro) phenyl (fen). Its discovery was the result of research during the 1950s and 1960s to find a safer alternative to aspirin. The molecule was discovered and synthesized by a team led by Stewart Adams, with a patent application filed in 1961. Adams initially tested the drug as treatment for his hangover. In 1985, Boots's worldwide patent for ibuprofen expired and generic products were launched.

The medication was launched as a treatment for rheumatoid arthritis in the United Kingdom in 1969, and in the United States in 1974. Later, in 1983 and 1984, it became the first NSAID (other than aspirin) to be available over-the-counter (OTC) in these two countries. Boots was awarded the Queen's Award for Technical Achievement in 1985 for the development of the drug.

In November 2013, work on ibuprofen was recognized by the erection of a Royal Society of Chemistry blue plaque at Boots' Beeston Factory site in Nottingham, which reads:

In recognition of the work during the 1980s by The Boots Company PLC on the development of ibuprofen, which resulted in its move from prescription-only status to over-the-counter sale, therefore expanding its use to millions of people worldwide

and another at BioCity Nottingham, the site of the original laboratory, which reads:

In recognition of the pioneering research work, here on Pennyfoot Street, by Dr Stewart Adams and Dr John Nicholson in the Research Department of Boots, which led to the discovery of ibuprofen used by millions worldwide for the relief of pain.

== Availability and administration ==
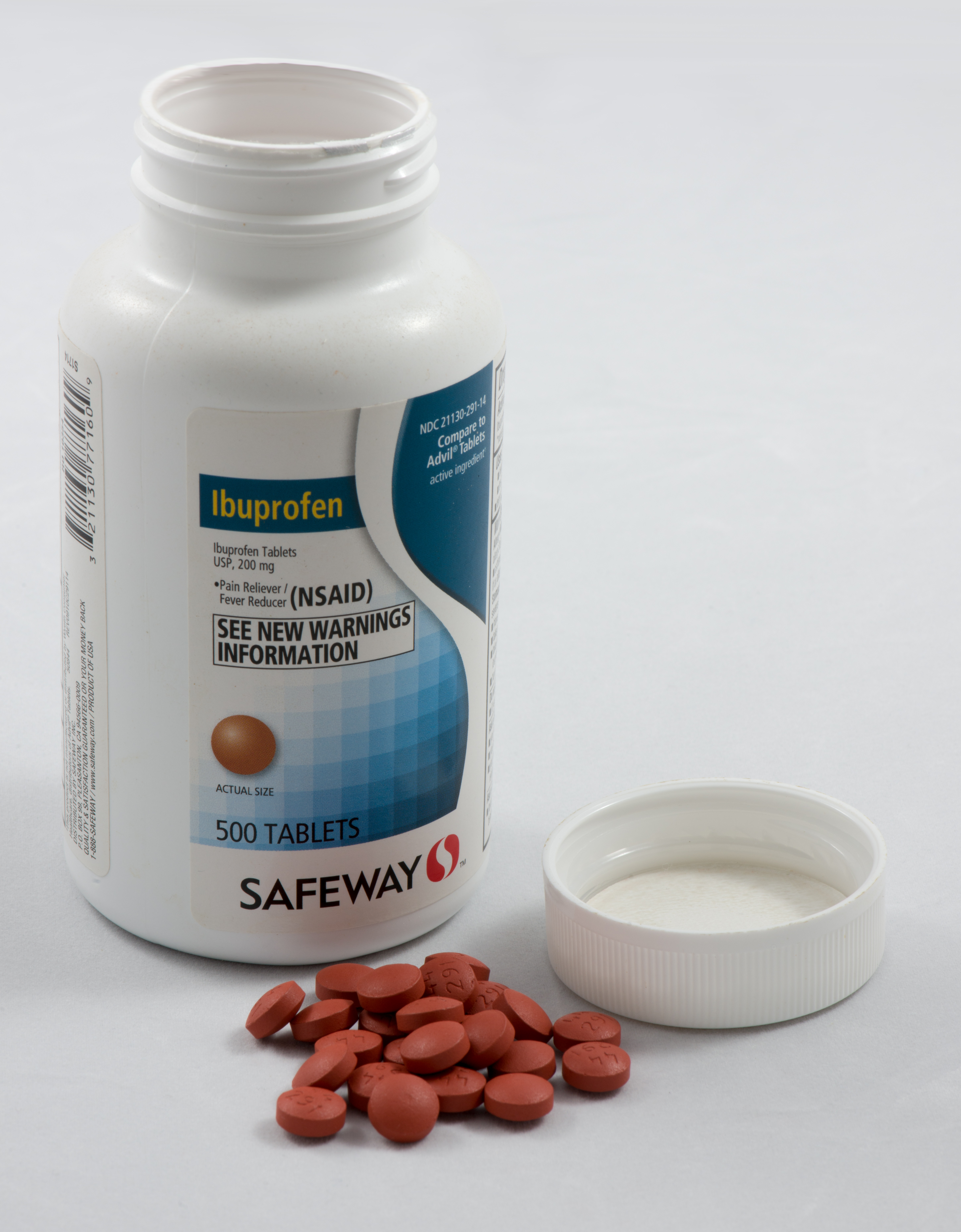
A bottle of generic ibuprofen

Ibuprofen was made available by prescription in the United Kingdom in 1969 and in the United States in 1974.

Ibuprofen is the international nonproprietary name (INN), British Approved Name (BAN), Australian Approved Name (AAN) and United States Adopted Name (USAN). In the United States, it has been sold under the brand-names Motrin and Advil since 1974 and 1984, respectively.

In 2009, the first injectable formulation of ibuprofen was approved in the United States, under the brand name Caldolor.

Ibuprofen can be taken orally (by mouth) and intravenously (injected into a vein).

== Research ==
Ibuprofen is sometimes used for the treatment of acne because of its anti-inflammatory properties, and has been sold in Japan in topical form for adult acne. As with other NSAIDs, ibuprofen may be useful in the treatment of severe orthostatic hypotension (low blood pressure when standing up). NSAIDs are of unclear utility in the prevention and treatment of Alzheimer's disease.

Ibuprofen has been associated with a lower risk of Parkinson's disease and may delay or prevent it. Aspirin, other NSAIDs, and paracetamol (acetaminophen) did not affect the risk for Parkinson's. In March 2011, researchers at Harvard Medical School announced that ibuprofen had a neuroprotective effect against the risk of developing Parkinson's disease. People regularly consuming ibuprofen were reported to have a 38% lower risk of developing Parkinson's disease, but no such effect was found for other pain relievers, such as aspirin and paracetamol. Use of ibuprofen to lower the risk of Parkinson's disease in the general population would not be problem-free, given the possibility of adverse effects on the urinary and digestive systems.

Some dietary supplements might be dangerous to take along with ibuprofen and other NSAIDs, but as of 2016, more research needs to be conducted to be certain. These supplements include those that can prevent platelet aggregation, including ginkgo, garlic, ginger, bilberry, dong quai, feverfew, ginseng, turmeric, meadowsweet (Filipendula ulmaria), and willow (Salix spp.); those that contain coumarin, including chamomile, horse chestnut, fenugreek and red clover; and those that increase the risk of bleeding, like tamarind.
