= Flurbiprofen =

Chemical compound

Clinical data
- Trade names: Ansaid, Ocufen, Strepfen
- Other names: (±)-2-fluoro-α-methyl-(1,1'-biphenyl)-4-acetic acid
- AHFS/Drugs.com: Monograph
- MedlinePlus: a687005
- Pregnancy category: AU: B2
- Routes of administration: By mouth
- ATC code: M01AE09 (WHO) , M02AA19 (WHO), R02AX01 (WHO), S01BC04 (WHO)

Legal status
- Legal status: AU: S2 (Pharmacy medicine) /S4; CA: ℞-only

Pharmacokinetic data
- Protein binding: > 99%
- Metabolism: Liver (CYP2C9)
- Elimination half-life: 4.7-5.7 hours
- Excretion: Kidney

Identifiers
- IUPAC name: (RS)-2-(2-fluorobiphenyl-4-yl)propanoic acid
- CAS Number: 5104-49-4
- PubChem CID: 3394
- IUPHAR/BPS: 4194
- DrugBank: DB00712
- ChemSpider: 3277
- UNII: 5GRO578KLP
- KEGG: D00330
- ChEBI: CHEBI:5130
- ChEMBL: ChEMBL563
- PDB ligand: FLP (PDBe, RCSB PDB)
- CompTox Dashboard (EPA): DTXSID0037231
- ECHA InfoCard: 100.023.479

Chemical and physical data
- Formula: C_{15}H_{13}FO_{2}
- Molar mass: 244.265 g·mol^{−1}
- 3D model (JSmol): Interactive image
- Chirality: Racemic mixture
- Melting point: 117 °C (243 °F)
- SMILES: Fc2cc(ccc2c1ccccc1)C(C(=O)O)C
- InChI: InChI=1S/C15H13FO2/c1-10(15(17)18)12-7-8-13(14(16)9-12)11-5-3-2-4-6-11/h2-10H,1H3,(H,17,18); Key:SYTBZMRGLBWNTM-UHFFFAOYSA-N

Flurbiprofen is a member of the phenylalkanoic acid derivative family of nonsteroidal anti-inflammatory drugs (NSAIDs). It is primarily indicated as a pre-operative anti-miotic (in an ophthalmic solution) as well as orally for arthritis or dental pain. Side effects are analogous to those of ibuprofen.

It was derived from propionic acid by the research arm of Boots UK during the 1960s, a period which also included the discovery of ibuprofen, indometacin, diclofenac, naproxen, ketoprofen, and sulindac.

It was patented in 1964 by Boots UK and approved for medical use in 1987. It was approved in the US in 1988; the first generic was approved in 1994.

== Adverse effects ==
In October 2020, the U.S. Food and Drug Administration (FDA) required the prescribing information to be updated for all nonsteroidal anti-inflammatory medications to describe the risk of kidney problems in unborn babies that result in low amniotic fluid. They recommend avoiding NSAIDs in pregnant women at 20 weeks or later in pregnancy.

== Society and culture ==
=== Brand names ===
As of 2016 the drug was available worldwide as drops for ophthalmic use and as tablets, both in various strengths, under many brand names which include: Acustop Cataplasma, Adofeed, Anazin, Anflupin, Anorcid, Ansaid, Antadys, Antafen, Antipain, Baenazin, Benactiv, Biprofin, Biprotec, Bro-Z, Brufen, Brufoz, Cebutid, Clinadol, Coryfin, Dispain, Edolfene, Eyeflur, Falken, Fiera, Flu Ro Fen, Flubifix, Flufen, Flugalin, Flupe, Flur di fen, Fluractive, Fluran, Flurbi Pap, Flurbic, Flurbiprofen, Flurbiprofène, Flurbiprofeno, Flurflex, Flurofen, Fluroptic, Fo Bi Pu Luo Fun, Forphen, Fortine, Froben, Frolix, Fubifen, Fubiprofen, Fubofen, Fukon, Fulruban, Furofen, Kai Fen, Kavoflog, Kotton, Lefenine, Majezik, Maprofen, Maxaljin, Maximus, Meiprofen, Myprofen, Neliacan, Nibelon, Nirolex Gola, Ocufen, Ocuflur, Optifen, Orofaringeo, Painil, Profen, Projezik, Ropion, Sigmaprofen, Stayban, Strefen, Strepfen, Strepflam, Strepsils (various formulations), Sulan, Tie Shr Shu, TransAct, Upnon, Urbifen, Yakuban, Zepolas, Zeralgo, Zero-P, and Zeton.

== Applications ==
Flurbiprofen is the starting material that is used in the synthesis of flomatizole & nitroflurbiprofen.

The (R)-enantiomer was claimed to not function as a NSAID but had anti-neurodegenerative properties. This was resolved into a separate drug entry that is called tarenflurbil.
