= Peter Doyle (chemist) =

British chemist

Peter Doyle OBE
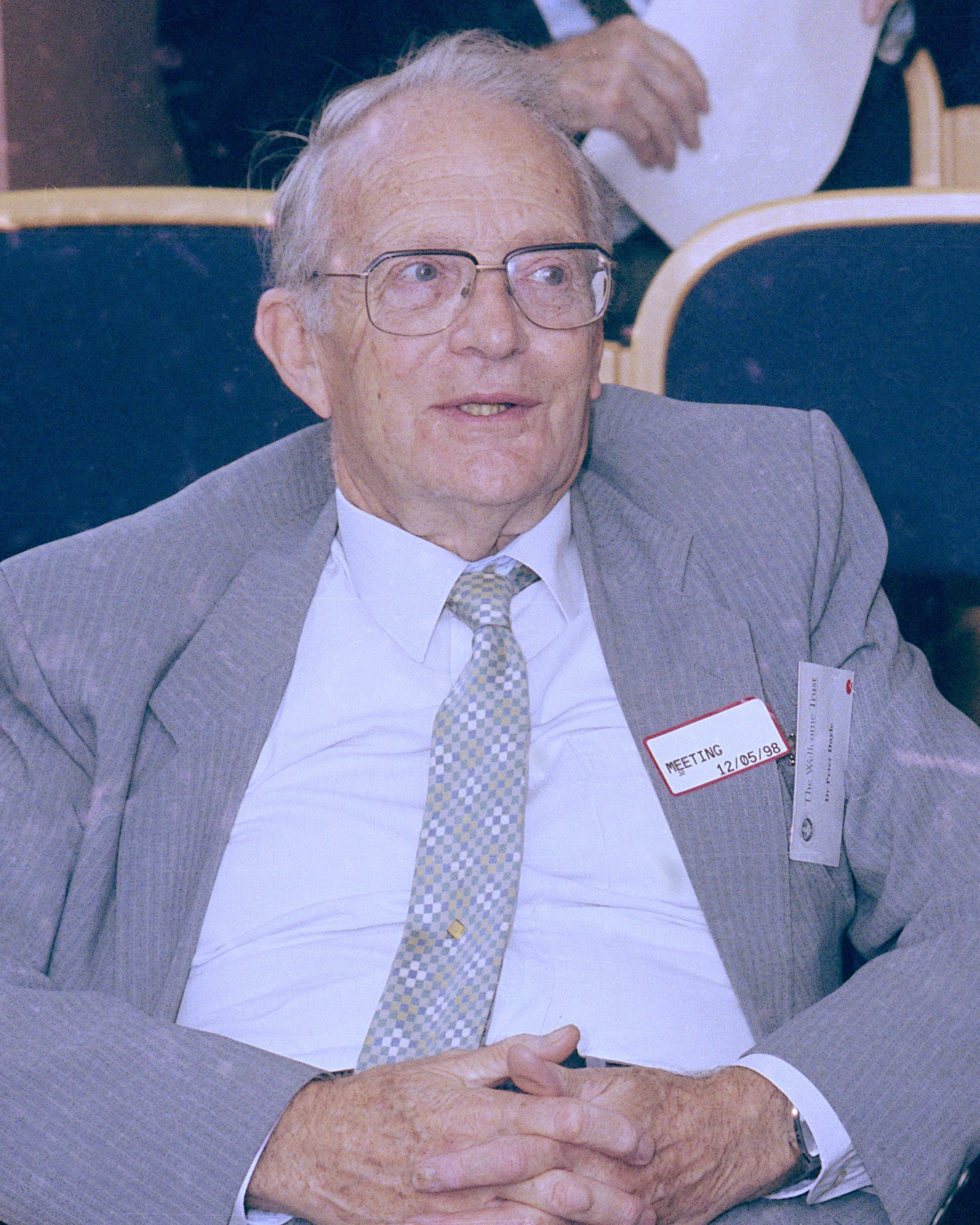
- Doyle in May 1998
- Born: Frank Peter Doyle; 20 December 1921; West Ham
- Died: 31 December 2004 (aged 83)
- Occupation: Research chemist

Peter Doyle OBE (20 December 1921 – 31 December 2004) was a British chemist.

== Career ==
Doyle obtained his degree from the University of London in 1944. In 1952 he obtained a position at Beecham Laboratories in Betchworth, and became Director of Research at Beecham Pharmaceuticals in 1962.

Along with Ralph Batchelor, George Rolinson, and John Nayler, he was part of the team at Betchworth that discovered and synthesised new penicillins. A Royal Society of Chemistry blue plaque now marks this discovery. Doyle retired in 1983.

== Awards ==
Doyle was given the Worshipful Society of Apothecaries' Gold Medal in Therapeutics in 1964 (awarded jointly with Dr. G N Rolinson).

In 1971, he was among a group awarded the Royal Society's Mullard Medal.

He was made an Officer of the Order of the British Empire (OBE) in the 1977 New Year Honours "for services to the pharmaceutical industry".

== Private life ==
Frank Peter Doyle and Joan Edith English married in Ilford in 1946 and had three children: Colin Peter (1949), Robert Allan (1951) and Hilary Joan (1960).

Joan Edith Doyle died on 14 June 2005.
