= Anthony Ledwith =

British chemist

Anthony Ledwith CBE FRS
- Born: 14 August 1933
- Died: 5 January 2015 (aged 81)
- Education: University of Liverpool (PhD)
- Spouse: Mary Clare Ryan
- Children: Four
- Awards: See list
- Scientific career
- Fields: Polymers
- Workplaces: University of Liverpool; Pilkington plc University of Sheffield
- Thesis: Some new types of polymerization (1957)

Anthony Ledwith CBE FRS (4 August 1933 – 5 January 2015) was a British chemist.

== Biography ==
Anthony Ledwith was born on 14 August 1933 in Goose Green, Greater Manchester to Thomas Ledwith and Mary Clare (née Coghlin) Thomas Ledwith was killed in a railway accident when Anthony was four and his brother Thomas was two.

Ledwith was educated locally: St Cuthbert's Primary School (1938–1945); Wigan Junior Technical School (1945–1948); and Wigan District Mining and Technical College (1948–1954). He was, with local help, able to go to London to take practical and written exams of the Royal Institute of Chemistry, which lasted a week. He was successful, and later in 1954 was also awarded a London University BSc External Honours degree.

Ledwith joined C. E. H. Bawn’s group to study for his PhD at the University of Liverpool. Here he was introduced to and became expert in the field of polymers, and was awarded the higher degree in 1957. He stayed on at Liverpool and became a lecturer, and was promoted to senior lecturer, reader and professor in turn, becoming Campbell Brown Professor of Industrial Chemistry in 1980. In 1984 Ledwith left academic life for a while to become Deputy Director, then Director, of Group Research at Pilkington plc. Not surprisingly, polymer coatings for glass were of particular interest to him. After retirement from Pilkington in 1996, he returned to academia as Professor and Head of the Chemistry Department at the University of Sheffield. In 1998 Ledwith was elected to be President of the Royal Society of Chemistry, a post he held until 2000.

=== Honours and awards ===
- 1954 ARIC (by examination)
- 1954 BSc(Hons) London University External
- 1957 PhD Liverpool
- 1970 DSc Liverpool
- Honorary DScs from City and Loughborough Universities and the University of East Anglia
- 1999–2003 Chairman, Engineering and Physical Sciences Research Council
- 1995 CBE (for services to science)
- 1995 Fellow of the Royal Society
- 1998–2000 President of the Royal Society of Chemistry

=== Books ===
- The Chemistry of Carbenes. London: Royal Institute of Chemistry, 1965
- Reactivity, mechanism and structure in polymer chemistry. Ed. by A D Jenkins and A Ledwith. Chichester: John Wiley, 1974
- Molecular behaviour and the development of polymeric materials. A M North and A Ledwith. London: Chapman Hall, 1975
- The Chemistry of the semiconductor industry, Ed. by S J Moss and A Ledwith. Glasgow : Blackie, 1987

=== Family ===
Anthony Ledwith married Mary Clare Ryan at St Marie's Church, Standish in 1960. They had three daughters and a son: Joanne (1961), Stephanie Clare (1963), Katherine Elizabeth (1964) and James Anthony (1969).

Anthony Ledwith died on 5 January 2015.
