= Tarenflurbil =

Chemical compound

Clinical data
- ATC code: none

Legal status
- Legal status: Withdrawn after Phase III

Identifiers
- IUPAC name: (R)-2-(3-Fluoro-4-phenylphenyl)propanoic acid
- CAS Number: 51543-40-9
- PubChem CID: 92337
- IUPHAR/BPS: 7340
- ChemSpider: 83361
- UNII: 501W00OOWA
- PDB ligand: FLR (PDBe, RCSB PDB)
- CompTox Dashboard (EPA): DTXSID40199508
- ECHA InfoCard: 100.052.041

Chemical and physical data
- Formula: C_{15}H_{13}FO_{2}
- Molar mass: 244.265 g·mol^{−1}
- 3D model (JSmol): Interactive image
- SMILES: Fc2cc(ccc2c1ccccc1)[C@H](C(=O)O)C
- InChI: InChI=1S/C15H13FO2/c1-10(15(17)18)12-7-8-13(14(16)9-12)11-5-3-2-4-6-11/h2-10H,1H3,(H,17,18)/t10-/m1/s1; Key:SYTBZMRGLBWNTM-SNVBAGLBSA-N

Tarenflurbil, Flurizan or R-flurbiprofen, is a single enantiomer of the racemate NSAID flurbiprofen. For several years, research and trials for the drug were conducted by Myriad Genetics, to investigate its potential as a treatment for Alzheimer's disease; that investigation concluded in June 2008 when the company announced it would discontinue development of the compound.

== Mechanism of action ==
At proposed therapeutic concentrations, this molecule lacks anti-inflammatory activity, and does not inhibit either cyclooxygenase 1 (COX-1) or cyclooxygenase 2 (COX-2) enzymes. Only the S-enantiomers of arylpropionic acid NSAID can potently inhibit COX, whereas the R-enantiomers exert almost no COX activity. R-Flurbiprofen is inefficiently converted into S-flurbiprofen, with 1.5% of the R-enantiomer undergoing bioinversion to the S-form. Although this compound lacks activity against COX, studies have shown that this drug is a potent reducer of levels of beta amyloid, the main constituent of amyloid plaques in Alzheimer's disease, and therefore there was interest in this drug as a therapeutic agent.

== Clinical trials ==
In 2005, Myriad Genetics reported the results of its Phase II clinical trial of Flurizan; it was the largest ever Alzheimer's drug treatment trial using R-flurbiprofen. Patients were split into three treatment groups, receiving placebo, 400 or 800 mg R-flurbiprofen twice daily for a year. Result from this trial showed that the drug was well tolerated, and positive trends were observed with the 800 mg twice-daily dose in patients with mild Alzheimer's disease. A subgroup of patients that were diagnosed with mild disease, and had high plasma drug levels had significantly less decline in two primary behavioral outcomes (Activities of Daily Living scale (ADCS-ADL = Alzheimer’s Disease Cooperative Study - ADL) and Global Function (CDR-SB = Clinical Dementia Rating-Sum of Boxes)). Approximately 80 patients enrolled in the optional follow-on study showed continuing benefits with R-flurbiprofen, with increasing positive trends over this period for all primary outcomes after 24 months. On March 5, 2007 Myriad reported final results of the two-year trial, showing that 42% of those 80 patients showed improvement or no decline in one or more of the three primary endpoints of cognition, global function and activities of daily living, compared to a typical 10% of patients on placebo.

A Phase III clinical study evaluated 800 mg R-flurbiprofen twice-daily versus placebo for 18 months exclusively in 1800 patients with mild Alzheimer's disease. This second trial concluded in February 2008 with results reported in the summer. After Phase III testing, which included nearly 1,700 patients with mild Alzheimer's disease treated for 18 months with either Flurizan or placebo, Myrial Genetics concluded that the drug did not improve thinking ability or the ability of patients to carry out daily activities significantly more than those patients with placebo. Peter Meldrum, the chief executive of Myriad, announced on June 30, 2008, that the company will no longer be developing Flurizan. Prior to this termination, Myriad had sold distribution rights in the European Union to Lundbeck for an initial payment of $100 million, which Lundbeck has indicated it will now take as a write-down.
