= List of blue plaques erected by the Royal Society of Chemistry =

This is a list of blue plaques erected by the Royal Society of Chemistry.

== Chemical Landmark Scheme ==
The Chemical Landmark Scheme (CLS) is a Royal Society of Chemistry initiative recognising sites where the chemical sciences have made a significant contribution to health, wealth, or quality of life. The blue plaques are publicly visible, and are intended to give everyone an insight into chemistry's relevance to everyday lives. CLS plaques for the first few years of the scheme (begun in 2001) were rectangular, black lettering on a steel background, but later plaques are hexagonal, white lettering on a blue background. Round plaques bearing RSC attribution do not bear the word "landmark" and are apparently without the scheme. The scheme was suspended in mid-2018 or earlier. As of mid-August 2021, the RSC promise to provide a formal nomination process for new plaques "shortly".

A list of plaques awarded to date can be found below.

Recently (as of mid-August 2021) the RSC have listed plaques on their own website. Currently that list omits the 2015 plaque for Robert Angus Smith below, but has the following additional plaques: four awarded later than the two 2016 plaques listed here, an extra 2006 plaque to Perkin, and a 1997 plaque relating to histamine H2-receptor antagonists. The RSC list has no inscriptions or photographs in contrast to this list, but it does have the precise date of the plaque award (whereas this list gives an approximate date of installation, normally some time after the award ceremony).

=== England ===
| Subject | Inscription | Location | Year installed | Photo | Open Plaques ref | Notes |
|---|---|---|---|---|---|---|
| Beecham Research Laboratories | In 1957 scientists working for Beecham Research Laboratories at nearby Brockham Park discovered a chemical which they used to develop many new penicillins with unique properties for the treatment of bacterial infections. These medicines have relieved suffering and saved millions of lives worldwide. | The Shop at Strood Green; 1 Tynedale Road; Betchworth, Surrey | 2016 | | | |
| Sir John Cornforth 1917–2013 | Shell Research Ltd Milstead Laboratory of Chemical Enzymology. In recognition of the pioneering work carried out here when he was co-director of the laboratory. Cornforth led a team that revealed the detailed chemistry of how enzymes work, and explained how cholesterol builds up in the body. He was awarded the Nobel Prize in Chemistry in 1975. | Kent Science Park; Broadoak Road; Sittingbourne, Kent | 2016 | | | |
| Sir Edward Frankland KCB 1825–1899 | Professor of Chemistry. Attended this school 1837–1839. Discovered many new chemical compounds, made important contributions to chemical theory, and improved the quality of domestic water supplies. President of the Chemical Society and the Institute of Chemistry. | Lancaster Royal Grammar School; East Road; Lancaster | 2015 | | | |
| Sir Humphry Davy Bt MRI PRS 1778–1829 | Apprentice apothecary to John Bingham Borlase in this building, 1795–1798. Progressed to the Medical Pneumatic Institution, Bristol, 1798 and to the Royal Institution, London, 1801. Davy established the nature of acids, identified 9 elements and invented the miner's safety lamp. | 1 Market Place; Penzance | 2015 | | | |
| Robert Angus Smith PhD FRS 1817–1884 | First Chief Inspector of the Alkali Inspectorate (1864–1884) Robert Angus Smith lived and worked in Manchester for 40 years, and for much of this time his laboratory was at 20 Grosvenor Square. Following his research in Manchester on air quality, in 1859 he was the first person to use the term 'acid rain'. | Oxford Road; Manchester | 2015 | | | |
| Daniel Douglas Eley OBE FRS 1914– | To mark the 100th birthday of Daniel Eley, pioneering physical chemist. His research, much of it conducted in Nottingham, bridges chemistry, physics and biology. It includes the Eley-Rideal mechanism of gas-surface reactions, organic semiconductors, discovery of the conductivity of DNA, ortho/para hydrogen conversion and understanding the structure of aqueous solutions. | The School of Chemistry; University of Nottingham; University Park; Nottingham | 2014 | | | |
| Saltend Chemicals Park | In recognition of 100 years of innovation in supplying the UK with transportation fuels and important base chemicals. Saltend has uniquely combined in one location the research, development and commercialisation of numerous new processes for the manufacture of organic acids, alcohols and their derivatives. | BP Chemicals Ltd; Saltend Chemicals Park; Hull | 2014 | | | |
| Johnson Matthey plc | In recognition of the 40th anniversary of the world's first commercial autocatalysts being manufactured on this site, and the subsequent development of catalysts and filters for gasoline and diesel vehicles that have cleaned billions of tonnes of pollutants from the environment worldwide. | Johnson Matthey; Orchard Road; Royston; Hertfordshire | 2014 | | | |
| Dorothy Hodgkin 1910–1994 | Led pioneering work in this building from 1956–1972 and elsewhere in Oxford on the structures of antibiotics, vitamins and proteins including penicillin, vitamin B12 and insulin, using X-ray diffraction techniques for which she received the Nobel Prize in Chemistry in 1964 | Department of Chemistry; University of Oxford; South Parks Road. OS map ref (± 00010) SP 51532 06850. Oxford | 2014 | | | |
| Ibuprofen | In recognition of the work during the 1980s by The Boots Company PLC on the development of ibuprofen which resulted in its move from prescription only status to over the counter sale, therefore expanding its use to millions of people worldwide | Building D6 at Boots Beeston Factory Site; Dunkirk Industrial Estate; 1 Thane Road; Nottingham | 2013 | | | |
| Ibuprofen | In recognition of the pioneering research work, here on Pennyfood Street, by Dr Stewart Adams and Dr John Nicholson in the Research Department of Boots which led to the discovery of ibuprofen used by millions worldwide for the relief of pain. | BioCity Nottingham; Pennyfoot Street; NG1 1GF; Nottingham | 2013 | | | |
| Surface-enhanced Raman spectroscopy | University of Southampton Chemistry. On this site in 1973, Martin Fleischmann, Patrick J. Hendra and A. James McQuillan recorded the first surface enhanced Raman spectra (SERS) leading to the development of a highly sensitive surface spectroscopic technique that is now used worldwide. | University of Southampton; Highfield; SO17 1BJ; Southampton | 2013 | | | |
| Rev Ron Lancaster MBE 1931– | For his contribution to fireworks research, development, professional displays and for services to the pyrotechnic industry for over 50 years | Kimbolton School; Kimbolton; PE28 0EA; Cambridge | 2013 | | | |
| Professor The Lord George Porter of Luddenham OM PRS 1920–2002 | 1985–2002 Chairman, Centre for Photomolecular Sciences and Visiting Professor, Imperial College. 1967 Nobel Laureate for the study of fast reactions by flash photolysis. | Wolfson Laboratories; Imperial College London; South Kensington Campus; SW7 2AZ; London | 2012 | | | |
| Inorganic chemistry Laboratory Science Area, Oxford 1982 | Glucose Sensor. In this laboratory on 20 July 1982, Allen Hill, Tony Cass and Graham Davis made the crucial discovery which led to the development of a unique electronic blood glucose sensor now used by millions of diabetics worldwide. | South Parks Road, Oxford. OS map ref (± 00010) SP 51532 06850. Oxford; 51.452884°N 1.151750°E | 2012 | | | |
| Thomas Graham House | This plaque, at the home of the Royal Society of Chemistry's publishing operations, commemorates the 170th anniversary of the society's scientific publishing, which has made a profound contribution to the advancement of the chemical sciences. | Thomas Graham House; Science Park; Milton Road; Cambridge; 52.235844°N 0.140903°E | 2011 | | 31676 | |
| ICI General Chemicals, Widnes Research Laboratory | In recognition of the outstanding scientific contribution made by Charles Suckling and others, close to this site in 1951, in the synthesis and subsequent commercial development of halothane, the world's first synthetic inhalation anaesthetic. | Catalyst Science Discovery Centre; Mersey Road; Widnes; Cheshire; WA8 0DF; Widnes; 53.352058°N 2.733822°W | 2011 | | | |
| Ernest Rutherford 1871–1937 | On the occasion of the 100th anniversary of the discovery of the atomic nucleus by Ernest Rutherford, a Nobel Laureate in Chemistry and pioneer in nuclear physics, at the University of Manchester. [NB This is presumed to be the inscription on the RSC plaque, but the photograph in this entry is of a different plaque of unknown date with a different legend, donated by the Council of the City of Manchester. Research on these plaques is in progress, but hampered by Covid-19 restrictions.] | Rutherford Building (just inside entrance), Coupland Street University of Manchester; Manchester | 2011 | | | |
| Unilever Research & Development Port Sunlight Laboratory | In recognition of the outstanding scientific contribution to the home and personal care industry made by Unilever Port Sunlight's laboratory since 1911. 100 years on, the people on site continue to deliver innovative products to enhance the lives of billions of consumers around the world. | Merseyside | 2011 | | | |
| Inorganic chemistry Laboratory Science Area, Oxford 1980 | Inorganic Chemistry Laboratory. Where in 1980, John B. Goodenough with Koichi Mizushima, Philip C. Jones and Philip J. Wiseman identified the cathode material that enabled development of the rechargeable lithium-ion battery. This breakthrough ushered in the age of portable electronic devices. | South Parks Road, Oxford. OS map ref (± 00010) SP 51532 06850. Oxford; 51.452884°N 1.151750°E | 2010 | | | |
| Pfizer Sandwich | In recognition of the significant and enduring contribution made by Pfizer Scientists to health and quality of life through the discovery, development and manufacture of novel medicines for human and animal use. Sandwich Research laboratories established 1957. | Sandwich, Kent | 2010 | | | |
| Sanofi-Aventis, Dagenham Site | In recognition of the pioneering research and manufacturing work carried out at the May & Baker (sanofi-aventis) Dagenham site in a wide range of chemical and pharmaceutical fields since 1934. These products continue to benefit patients and their quality of life around the world. | Dagenham; Essex | 2010 | | | |
| Medical Research Council Human Nutrition Research | This plaque is in recognition of the pioneering work in the nutrition science carried out by Dr Elsie Widdowson (1906–2000). Her research provided a foundation for the work which continues in this laboratory today to improve the health of the population. | Human Nutrition Research; 120 Fulbourn Road; CB1 9NL; Cambridge | 2009 | | | |
| Harwell Laboratory | In recognition of the pioneering research and development work performed by scientists at Harwell since 1946. Their work has provided fundamental support in the development of nuclear power in the UK and a greater understanding of the chemistry of the actinide elements. | Harwell Campus Management HQ Building; Thomson Avenue; OX11 0GD. OS map ref (± 00010) SU 48075 87128. Didcot | 2009 | | | |
| Sir Joseph Wilson Swan FRS 1828–1914 | Chemist, physicist and inventor of the incandescent light bulb which he first demonstrated at a public lecture here on 3 February 1879. Nearby Mosley Street was the first street in the world to be lit by such electric bulbs. | Literary and Philosophical Society of Newcastle; 23 Westgate Road; NE1 1SE; Newcastle upon Tyne | 2009 | | | |
| Chemistry Department University College London | During the period 1930–1970 Professor Sir Christopher Ingold pioneered our understanding of the electronic basis of structure, mechanism and reactivity in organic chemistry, which is fundamental to modern-day chemistry. | University College London; 20 Gordon Street; WX1H 0AJ; London | 2008 | | | |
| Alderley Park | In recognition of the pioneering work carried out by chemists at the Alderley Park site since 1957 which has led to the discovery of therapeutic medicines, including beta-blockers and cancer therapies, that continue to provide benefits for patients throughout the world. | AstraZeneca; Alderely Park; SK10 4TF; Macclesfield | 2008 | | | |
| John Snow 1813–1848 | Founding father of Epidemiology. In 1854 his research linked deaths to the water pump near this site and thus determined that cholera is a water borne disease. | Broadwick (formerly Broad) Street; Soho; London; 51.304850°N 0.081129°E | 2008 | | 1962 | |
| Chemistry Department University College London 1930–1970 | Chemistry Department University College London During the period 1930–1970 Professor Sir Christopher Ingold pioneered our understanding of the electronic basis of structure, mechanism and reactivity in organic chemistry, which is fundamental to modern-day chemistry. | Gordon St, Bloomsbury, Euston, WC1H 0AH; London; 51.312997°N 0.075720°E | 2008 | | | |
| Jealott's Hill International Research Centre | This plaque is in recognition of the pioneering work carried out by scientists on this site since 1928. Research at Jealott's Hill has led to global developments in agriculture which have helped feed people and improve their quality of life. | Syngenta; Jealott's Hill International Research Centre; Berkshire; RG42 6EY; Bracknell | 2007 | | | |
| Clarendon Laboratory 1887–1915 | Clarendon Laboratory where H.G.J. Moseley (1887–1915) completed his pioneering studies on the frequencies of X-rays emitted from the elements. His work established the concept of atomic number and helped reveal the structure of the atom. He predicted several new elements and laid the ground for a major tool in chemical analysis. (Plaque as shown in photograph deteriorated further - note bulging of paint - and was replaced in 2019 with a new plaque identical in inscription but with the current RSC logo as shown for instance in photographs on plaques dated 2015.) | Clarendon Laboratory; Sherrington Road, OX1 3PU. OS map ref (± 00010) SP 51412 07013. Oxford; 51.453343°N 1.152281°E | 2007 | | 4698 | |
| John Dalton FRS 1766–1844 | 1778–1793: Teacher (Eaglesfield, Pardshaw, Kendal); 1793–1844: Scientist and Educator (Manchester); 1817–1844: President, Manchester Lit & Phil Soc; Laws of Partial Pressures and Multiple Proportions, recognised Colour Blindness and revolutionised Chemistry through his Atomic Theory | John Dalton Cottage; CA13; Eaglesfied | 2007 | | | |
| Sir Derek Barton FRS 1918–1998 | 1938–1942 Student, 1957–1978 Professor, Imperial College; 1969 Nobel Laureate for new concept of organic conformational analysis Erected in the Centenary Year of Imperial College London | Imperial College London; South Kensington Campus; SW7 2AZ; London | 2007 | | | |
| Sir Geoffrey Wilkinson FRS 1921–1996 | 1939–1943 Student, 1956–1996 Professor, Imperial College; 1973 Nobel Laureate for pioneering studies on organometallic compounds Erected in the Centenary Year of Imperial College London | Imperial College London; South Kensington Campus; SW7 2AZ; London | 2007 | | | |
| Sir William H. Perkin 1838–1907 | discovered mauveine, the world's first synthetic dyestuff, in 1856. He and his brother Thomas produced mauveine from a factory on this site in 1857, and later alizarin, thus laying the foundations of the organic chemicals industry. This replaces a centenary plaque unveiled by Sir R Robinson in 1957. | Oldfield Lane N Greendford; UB6; London | 2006 | | | |
| Hexagon Site | This plaque recognises Hexagon Site as a Chemical Landmark. Since 1786, this site has been at the heart of dyestuffs development and production in the UK. | Hexagon Tower; Crumpsall Vall; Blackley; M9 8ES; Manchester | 2006 | | | |
| Natural Products | Research in the Department of Chemistry at Cambridge over more than 50 years has established the structures and many principles of the synthesis of molecules that control the processes of life. Notably, Lord Alexander Todd FRS and his co-workers invented the chemical synthesis of nucleotides which led to the elucidation of the chemical structure of DNA. | Department of Chemistry; University of Cambridge; Lensfield Road; CB2 1EW; Cambridge | 2005 | | | |
| Liquid Crystals | Research in the Department of Chemistry at Hull over more than 50 years has established many principles of the design, synthesis and properties of liquid crystals for applications in display devices. Notably, Professor George Gray FRS, CBE and his co-workers invented the cyanobiphenyl class of materials, which were key to developing the first successful liquid crystal display devices. | Hull | 2005 | | | |
| William Ramsay, Nobel Laureate 1904 | Between 1894 and 1910, in a laboratory near this site, William Ramsay discovered and characterised the noble gases, completing the structure of the Periodic Table of Elements. | University College London; Gower Street; WC1E 6BT; London | 2004 | | | |
| Winnington Laboratory | This plaque commemorates the discovery of polyethylene (better known as polythene) by R O Gibson and E W Fawcett on 27 March 1933 working in the former ICI research laboratory close to this site. | Winnington Hall; Winnington Lane; Northwich; CW8 4DU; Winnington | 2004 | | | |
| Dyson Perrins Laboratory | This laboratory was a major centre for Organic Chemistry from 1916–2003. It had four Heads in that time, the Waynflete Professors W H Perkin Jnr, Sir Robert Robinson OM, Sir Ewart Jones, and Sir Jack Baldwin. Sir Robert was awarded the Nobel Prize in 1947 for work done here on natural products. | Oxford Radiocarbon Accelerator Unit; Dyson Perrins Building; South Parks Road; OX1 3QY. OS map ref (± 00010) SP 51609 06916. Oxford | 2004 | | | |
| Silicone Polymers | Commemorating the pioneering work into the development of silicone polymers conducted by Professor Frederic S. Kipping, FRS, first Sir Jesse Boot Professor of Chemistry, at the University College laboratories in Shakespeare Street, Nottingham (1897–1928), and the Trent Building laboratories, University Park (1928–1936). His research formed the basis for the worldwide development of the synthetic rubber and silicone-based lubricant industries. | School of Chemistry; University of Nottingham; NG7 2RD; Nottingham | 2004 | | | |
| William Henry Bragg (1862–1942) and William Lawrence Bragg (1890–1971) | Near this site, between 1912 and 1914, Sir William H. Bragg and his son Sir W. Lawrence Bragg carried out research that led to the Nobel Prize in Physics in 1915. Their work formed the basis of crystal structure determination by X-ray diffraction which has made an outstanding contribution to chemical science. | School of Chemistry; University of Leeds; LS2 9JT; Leeds | 2003 | | | |
| Former site of the Royal College of Chemistry 1845–1872 | The College was modelled on Liebig's Laboratory at Giessen, Germany by AW Hofmann. Here, Hofmann inspired the young to do great things in chemistry, and relate them to both academic and everyday life. | 299 Oxford Street; W1C 2DZ; London | 2003 | | | |
| King's College London | Near this site Rosalind Franklin, Maurice Wilkins, Raymond Gosling, Alexander Stokes and Herbert Wilson performed experiments that led to the discover of the structure of DNA. This work revolutionised our understanding of the chemistry behind life itself. | The Strand; King's College London; WC2R 347; London | 2003 | | | |
| Professor Sir Alec Jeffreys 1950– | In 1984 the principles behind DNA fingerprinting were discovered in this building by Professor Sir Alec Jeffreys and his research group. | Department of Genetics; University of Leicester; Leicester | 2002 | | | |
| Royal Gunpowder Mills | For over 300 years explosives and propellants were developed and produced on this site. Work performed here has been influential in the development of the Bouncing Bomb, Kevlar and Ejector Seat technology. | Waltham Abbey | 2002 | | | |
| Dr Archer John Porter Martin (1910–2002) and Dr Richard Laurence Millington Synge (1914–1994) | Close to this site, in the Torridon Laboratories of the Wool Industries Research Association between 1940 and 1943, Dr Archer John Porter Martin and Dr Richard Laurence Millington Synge developed the technique of partition chromatography. Originally developed for the separation of amino acids from wool proteins, the technique became the basis for future widespread chromatographic analysis in research and development in many branches of chemistry. Drs Martin and Synge were jointly awarded the Nobel Prize for Chemistry in 1952 for this research. | Leeds | 2001 | | | |
| Johnson Matthey Technology Centre | Pioneering work has been carried out in these laboratories since 1970 on the chemistry of Platinum Group Metals for the development of car exhaust catalysts and the design of platinum anti-cancer drugs. Exhaust catalysts are fitted to most modern vehicles and make a global contribution to air quality. Platinum-based drugs play a major role in cancer therapy. | Berkshire | 2001 | | | |
| Frederick Crace Calvert PhD FRS 1819–1873 | 1846 Professor of Chemistry at the Manchester Royal Institution (City Art Gallery); 1850 F C Calvert and Co near this site 1857 First commercial production of phenol, carbolic acid, used as a disinfectant in soaps and powders and for making dyes | Princess Street; Manchester; M1 3WF | | | 1273 | |

=== Scotland ===
| Subject | Inscription | Location | Year installed | Photo | Open Plaques ref | Notes |
|---|---|---|---|---|---|---|
| Thomas Graham 1805–1869 | Born in Glasgow and Professor of Chemistry at Anderson's University (now University of Strathclyde) from 1830–1837. His famous contributions to Science were Graham's Law of Diffusion and his pioneering work on dialysis. He founded the Chemical Society of London in 1841, and became Master of the Mint. He is commemorated by this building and by a statue in George Square. | Department of Pure & Applied Chemistry; University of Strathclyde; Thomas Graham Building; 295 Cathedral Street; Glasgow; 55.862822°N 4.246515°W | 2014 | | 39209 | |
| James 'Paraffin' Young 1811–1883 | In recognition of his outstanding contribution, started on a site close to here in Birniehill Bathgate, where in c. 1850 he processed torbanite ('cannel coal') to create the first commercial production of paraffin oil in the world, leading to the major shale oil industry in West Lothian | Bennie Museum; 9–11 Mansefield Street; Bathgate | 2012 | | | |
| Professor Joseph Black 1728–1799 | Student 1744–1752; Lecturer in Chemistry 1756–1766; Professor of Medicine 1757–1766; Discoverer of Latent Heat, at the Old College, High Street | University of Glasgow; Joseph Black Building; University Place; Glasgow; 55.872507°N 4.293950°W | 2009 | | 11166 | |
| Professor Joseph Black 1728–1799 | Graduate of Medicine 1754; Professor of Chemistry 1766–1799; Discovered the Properties of Fixed Air (Carbon Dioxide); Promoter of the Scottish Chemical Industry | University of Edinburgh; Joseph Black Building; David Brewster Road; Edinburgh | 2009 | | | |

=== Northern Ireland ===
| Subject | Inscription | Location | Year installed | Photo | Open Plaques ref | Notes |
|---|---|---|---|---|---|---|
| Thomas Andrews 1813–1885 | Close to this site, in 1869, Andrews discovered the 'critical temperature' for the liquefaction of carbon dioxide, the basis of cryogenics and of low temperature chemistry and physics | Queen's University Belfast; University Road; Belfast | 2013 | | | The plaque is indoors. |

=== Wales ===
| Subject | Inscription | Location | Year installed | Photo | Open Plaques ref | Notes |
|---|---|---|---|---|---|---|
| Professor Edward Hughes 1906–1963 | Professor Edward (Ted) D Hughes FRS, who conducted ground breaking work on kinetics and mechanisms in organic chemistry 1943–48, played a prominent role in the 125 year history (1884–2009) of Chemistry at Bangor. Gwnaeth yr Athro Edward (Ted) D Hughes FRS waith arloesol ar gineteg a mecanwaith ym maes cemeg organig rhwng 1943 a 1948, gan chwarae rhan amiwg yn hanes cemeg ym Mangor (1884–2009) | School of Chemistry; Bangor University; Bangor, Gwynedd | 2009 | | | |

=== International ===
| Subject | Inscription | Location | Year installed | Photo | Open Plaques ref | Notes |
|---|---|---|---|---|---|---|
| August Kekulé 1829–1896 | Recognising his pioneering work at Ghent University (1858–1867) on structural and organic aromatic chemistry | Ghent University; Aula Ugent; Voldersstraat 9; 9000; Gent; Belgium | 2011 | | | |
| Académie de Sciences, Paris | In tribute to the Institut de France for honouring British Chemist Sir Humphry Davy in 1808 and encouraging the international exchange of scientific knowledge. | | 2008 | | | |

== Other ==
| Subject | Inscription | Location | Year installed | Photo | Open Plaques ref | Notes |
|---|---|---|---|---|---|---|
| Edward Frankland and Henry Enfield Roscoe | Sir Edward Frankland PhD FRS Professor of Chemistry 1851–1857 Organometallic compounds. Bonding and Valency. Water Analysis First President of the Institute of Chemistry. Sir Henry Enfield Rosecoe BA PhD FRS Professor of Chemistry 1857–1886 Vanadium. Photochemistry. Spectroscopy. First President of the Society of Chemical Industry Active in the transfer of Owens College from this building to Oxford Road in 1873 and in the foundation of the Victory University in 1880 | former County Court, Quay Street; Manchester; 53.478594°N 2.251999°W | | | 963 | |
| The development of penicillin 1928–1945 | In 1928, at St. Mary's Hospital, London, Alexander Fleming discovered penicillin. This discovery led to the introduction of antibiotics that greatly reduced the number of deaths from infection. Howard W. Florey, at the University of Oxford working with Ernst B. Chain, Norman G. Heatley and Edward P. Abraham, successfully took penicillin from the laboratory to the clinic as a medical treatment in 1941. The large-scale development of penicillin was undertaken in the United States of America during the 1939–1945 World War, led by scientists and engineers at the Northern Regional Research Laboratory of the US Department of Agriculture, Abbott Laboratories, Lederle Laboratories, Merck & Co., Inc., Chas. Pfizer & Co. Inc., and E.R. Squibb & Sons. The discovery and development of penicillin was a milestone in twentieth century pharmaceutical chemistry. | St Mary's Hospital; Praed Street; W2 1NY; London | 1999 | | | Erected jointly with American Chemical Society |
| Joseph Priestley | On this site in the former New Meeting House Joseph Priestley LLD FRS scholar, scientist, theologian and discoverer of oxygen ministered to his congregation from 1870 to 1791 | St Michael's Church; New Meeting Street; Birmingham; 52.4799600°N 1.892589°W | 1980 | | 1596 | Erected jointly with Birmingham Civic Society |
| John Dalton | John Dalton 1766–1844 taught natural philosophy and mathematics at the Academy on this site 1793–1800. His Atomic Theory was first presented on 21 October 1803 to the Manchester Literary and Philosophical Society of which he was President 1816–1844 | Peace Garden; Manchester; 53.47856°N 2.24272°W | 2003 | | 968 | |
