= Phenyl alkanoic acids =

Short chain ω-phenylalkanoic acids have long been known to occur in natural products. Phenylacetic, 3-phenylpropanoic and 3-phenylpropenoic (cinnamic) acids are found in propolis, mammalian exocrine secretions or plant fragrances. During a systematic study of the lipids from seeds of the plant Araceae, the presence of 13-phenyltridecanoic acid as a major component (5-16% of total fatty acids)was discovered. Other similar compounds but with 11 and 15 carbon chain lengths and saturated or unsaturated were shown to be also present but in lower amounts. At the same time, the even carbon chain ω-phenylalkanoic acids of C10 up to C16 were discovered in halophilic bacteria.

== ω-phenylalkanoic acid (x = 1 to 17) ==
Later, an exhaustive study of 17 genus of the subfamily Aroideae of Araceae revealed the presence of three major acids, 11-phenylundecanoic acid, 13-phenyltridecanoic acid and 15-phenylpentadecanoic acid in seed lipids. Other odd carbon number acids from C7 to C23 were detected but in trace amounts. Similarly, two series of homologous odd carbon number monounsaturated ω-phenylalkanoic acids were found. Thus, it can be stated that all odd carbon chain ω-phenylalkanoic acids from C1 through C23 have been found in nature. Furthermore, even carbon chain ω-phenylalkanoic acids from C10 through C16 were also detected.

Substituted phenylalkenoic acids are periodically encountered in nature. As an example, rubrenoic acids were purified from Alteromonas rubra, compounds which showed bronchodilatatoric properties.

Methyl phenylalkenoic acids (5 carbon chain) have been described from a terrestrial Streptomycete. Serpentene, a similar polyunsaturated phenylalkenoic acid, is also produced by Streptomyces and was shown to have some antibacterial properties.

Several serpentene-like compounds have also been isolated from the same bacterial source.

Several bicyclic derivatives of linolenic acid were shown to be generated by alkali isomerization.

The stink from the stinkpot turtle (Sternotherus odoratus) contains at least four different foul smelling ω-phenylalkanoic acids, including phenylacetic acid, 3-phenylpropionic acid, 5-phenylpentanoic acid, and 7-phenylheptanoic acid.

== Bicyclic hexahydroindenoic acid ==
Some others (alkyl-phenyl)-alkanoic acids) are formed when linolenic acid is warmed at 260–270 °C.

Several forms with 16, 18 and 20 carbon atoms were identified in archaeological pottery vessels and were presumed to have been generated during heating triunsaturated fatty acids. They were used as biomarkers to trace the ancient processing of marine animal in these vessels.

Several benzoic acid derivatives have been described in leaves of various Piperaceae species. Thus, a prenylated benzoic acid acid derivative, crassinervic acid, has been isolated from Piper crassinervium.

== Crassinervic acid ==
Similar compounds were isolated from Piper aduncum (aduncumene) and P. gaudichaudianum (gaudichaudianic acid). All these molecules showed high potential as antifungal compounds. A prenylated benzoic acid with a side chain formed of two isoprene units has also been isolated from the leaves of Piper aduncum. More recently, three prenylated benzoic acid derivatives with four isoprene units have been extracted from the leaves of P. heterophyllum and P. aduncum. These compounds displayed moderate antiplasmodial (against Plasmodium falciparum) and trypanocidal (against Trypanosoma cruzi) activities.
