= Allen Hill (scientist) =

British chemist (1937–2021)

- Born: Hugh Allen Oliver Hill; 23 May 1937
- Died: 30 July 2021 (aged 84)
- Education: Queen's University Belfast
- Known for: bioinorganic chemistry
- Spouse: Boglárka Anna Pinter
- Children: 3
- Awards: Mullard Award (1993), Royal Medal (2010)
- Scientific career
- Fields: Chemistry
- Workplaces: University of Oxford

Hugh Allen Oliver Hill FRSC FRS (23 May 1937 – 30 July 2021), usually known as Allen Hill, was Professor, and later Emeritus Professor, of Bioinorganic Chemistry at the University of Oxford and Honorary Fellow of The Queen's College, Oxford, and Wadham College, Oxford. He was elected a Fellow of the Royal Society in 1990 and was awarded the 2010 Royal Medal of the Royal Society "for his pioneering work on protein electrochemistry, which revolutionised the diagnostic testing of glucose and many other bioelectrochemical assays.".

After studying at Queen's University Belfast Hill moved to Oxford in 1962, becoming a fellow of The Queen's College in 1965. His research awards include the Interdisciplinary award, the Chemistry and Electrochemistry of Transition Metals medal, and the Robinson award of the Royal Society of Chemistry, the Breyer medal of the Royal Australian Chemical Institute and the Mullard Award and the Royal Medal of the Royal Society.

In 2012 his work on the electrochemical monitoring of proteins and its application to the monitoring of glucose concentrations in the blood of diabetic patients was marked by the award of a National Chemical Landmark blue plaque in Oxford.
