= Tuberculous cellulitis =

- Specialty: Dermatology

Tuberculous cellulitis is a skin condition resulting from infection with mycobacterium, and presenting as cellulitis.

== See also ==
- Lupus vulgaris
- Metastatic tuberculous abscess or ulceration
- Miliary tuberculosis
- Skin lesion
