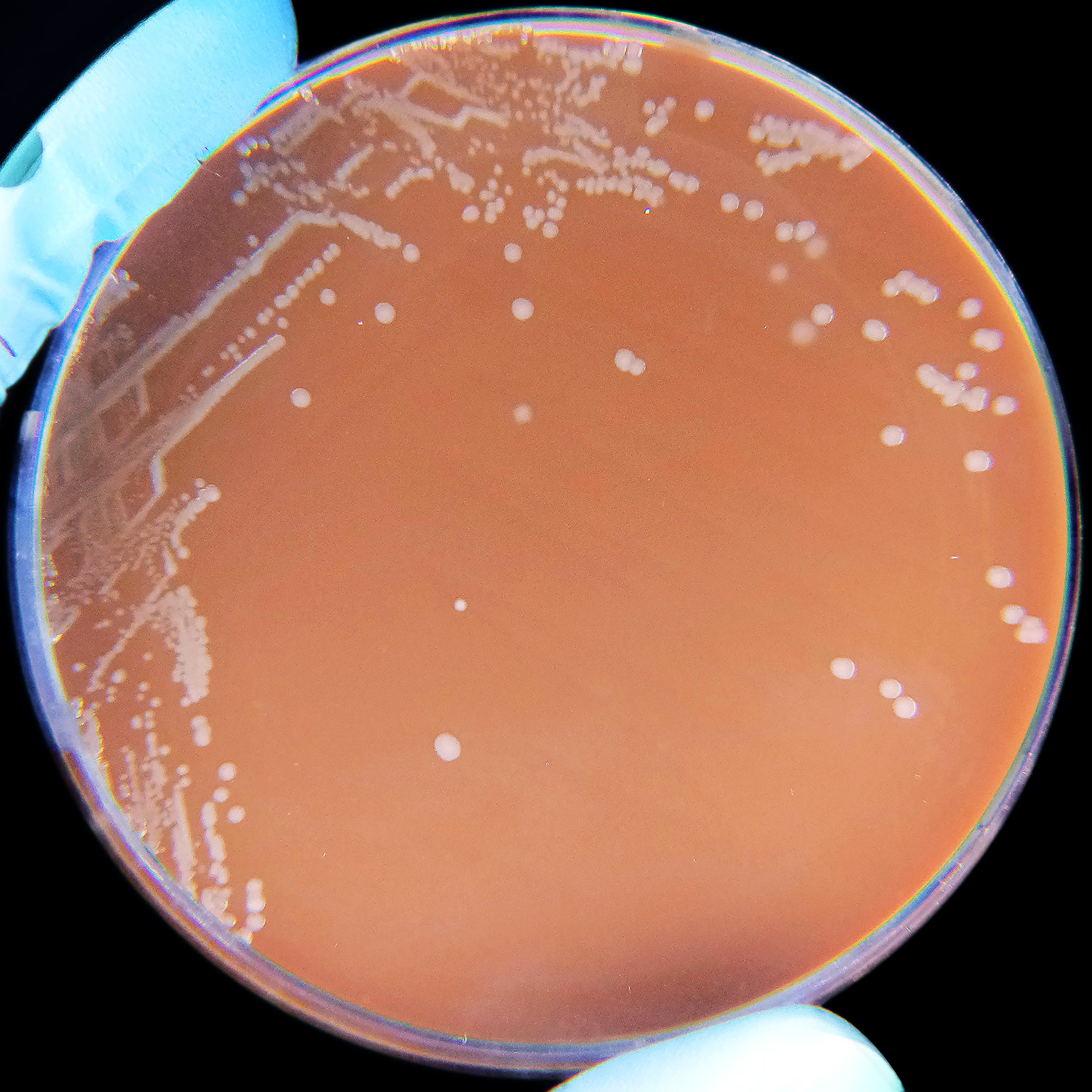
- H. influenzae on a chocolate agar plate

Scientific classification
- Domain: Bacteria
- Kingdom: Pseudomonadati
- Phylum: Pseudomonadota
- Class: Gammaproteobacteria
- Order: Pasteurellales
- Family: Pasteurellaceae
- Genus: Haemophilus
- Species: H. influenzae

Binomial name
- Haemophilus influenzae (Lehmann & Neumann 1896); Winslow et al. 1917

= Haemophilus influenzae =

Species of bacterium

Haemophilus influenzae (formerly called Pfeiffer's bacillus or Bacillus influenzae) is a Gram-negative, non-motile, coccobacillary, facultatively anaerobic, capnophilic pathogenic bacterium of the family Pasteurellaceae. The bacteria are mesophilic and grow best at temperatures between 35 and 37 °C.

H. influenzae was first described in 1893 by Richard Pfeiffer during an influenza pandemic when he incorrectly identified it as the causative microbe, which is why the bacterium was given the name "influenzae". H. influenzae is responsible for a wide range of localized and invasive infections, typically in infants and children, including pneumonia, meningitis, or bloodstream infections. Treatment consists of antibiotics; however, H. influenzae is often resistant to the penicillin family, but amoxicillin/clavulanic acid can be used in mild cases. Serotype B H. influenzae (hib) can cause illness, called Hib infections, among other names. It has been a major cause of meningitis in infants and small children, frequently causing deafness and mental degradation. However, the development in the 1980s of a vaccine effective in this age group (the Hib vaccine) has almost eliminated this in developed countries.

This species was the first organism to have its entire genome sequenced.

== Physiology and metabolism ==
=== Structure ===
H. influenzae is a small Gram-negative bacterium, approximately 0.3 micrometer to 1 micrometer. Like other Gram-negative bacteria, H. influenzae has a thin peptidoglycan layer surrounded by an outer membrane containing lipopolysaccharide. Some types of H. influenzae contain a polysaccharide capsule around the outer membrane to aid in protection and colonization. The bacteria are pleomorphic, meaning the shape of the bacterium is variable, however it is typically coccobacillus or rod-shaped. H. Influenzae contains pili, which are specialized to adhere to the human nasopharynx. The H. Influenzae pili, unlike those of E. coli, resist unwinding, allowing for stronger adhesion to resist expulsion when coughing or sneezing. A minority of non-typeable, or unencapsulated, H. influenzae employ a variety of attachment techniques, such as pili, adhesins, or Hia and Hap proteins. Though the bacteria possess pili, they are not used for traditional movement or motility, and the bacterium is still considered to be non-motile.

The cell wall of H. influenzae bacterium contains various proteins, referred to as autotransporters, for adherence and colony formation. H. influenzae prefers to bind to mucus linings or non-ciliated epithelial cells, which is facilitated by Hap𝘴 autotransporters in the cell wall binding with unknown receptors within the epithelium. The Hap𝘴 autotransporters also facilitate the formation of microcolonies of the bacteria. These microcolonies are likely responsible for the formation of various biofilms within the body, such as those responsible for middle ear or lung infections.

=== Penicillin binding proteins ===
Penicillin binding proteins (PBPs) catalyze steps in peptidoglycan metabolism. They carry out essential processes needed to build and modify the cell wall. These proteins are the targets blocked by penicillin and other beta-lactam antibiotics that bind to PBPs, hence their name. Some antibiotic-resistant isolates of H. Influenzae contain modified PBPs that resist beta-lactam action by producing beta-lactamases to degrade these antibiotics. This resistance is likely due to a N526K mutation, or R517H substitution in conjunction with another unknown mutation. The R517H substitution alone did not have a lower affinity for penicillin, and therefore cannot cause resistance alone. Beta-lactamase emergence in the 1970s caused the therapy for severe cases of H. influenzae to be changed from ampicillin to cephalosporins, however further resistance to cephalosporins has occurred due to changes in the transpeptidase domain of penicillin binding protein 3 (PBP3).

=== Serotypes ===
H. influenzae isolates were initially characterized as either encapsulated (having an extracellular polysaccharide layer, the bacterial capsule) or unencapsulated. Encapsulated strains were further classified on the basis of the immune response to the type of polysaccharides in their capsule. The six generally recognized types of encapsulated H. influenzae are: a, b, c, d, e, and f. H. Influenzae type b, also known as Hib, is the most common form, recognizable by its polyribosyl ribitol phosphate (PRP) capsule, and found mostly in children. Types a, e, and f have been isolated infrequently, while types d and c are rarely isolated. Unencapsulated strains are more genetically diverse than the encapsulated group. Unencapsulated strains are termed nontypable (NTHi) because they lack capsular serotypes; however, all H. influenzae isolates can now be classified by multilocus sequence typing and other molecular methods. Most NTHi strains are considered to be part of the normal human flora in the upper and lower respiratory tract, genitals, and conjunctivae (mucous membranes of the eye).

=== Metabolism ===
H. influenzae uses the Embden–Meyerhof–Parnas (EMP) pathway for glycolysis and the pentose phosphate pathway, which is anabolic rather than catabolic. The citric acid cycle is incomplete and lacks several enzymes that are found in a fully functioning cycle. The enzymes missing from the TCA cycle are citrate synthase, aconitate hydratase, and isocitrate dehydrogenase. H. influenzae has been found in both aerobic and anaerobic environments, as well as environments with different pH's.

== Genome and genetics ==
H. influenzae was the first free-living organism to have its entire genome sequenced. The sequencing was completed in 1995 by Craig Venter and his team at the Institute for Genomic Research, now part of the J. Craig Venter Institute. Haemophilus was chosen because one of the project leaders, Nobel laureate Hamilton Smith, had been working on it for decades and was able to provide high-quality DNA libraries. The sequencing method used was whole-genome shotgun, which was completed and published in Science in 1995.

The genome of strain Rd KW20 consists of 1,830,138 base pairs of DNA in a single circular chromosome that contains 1604 protein-coding genes, 117 pseudogenes, 57 tRNA genes, and 23 other RNA genes. About 90% of the genes have homologs in E. coli, another gamma-proteobacterium. In fact, the similarity between genes of the two species ranges from 18% to 98% protein sequence identity, with the majority sharing 40–80% of their amino acids (with an average of 59%).

Conjugative plasmids (DNA molecules that are capable of horizontal transfer between different species of bacteria) can frequently be found in H. influenzae. It is common that the F+ plasmid of a competent Escherichia coli bacterium conjugates into the H. influenzae bacterium, which then allows the plasmid to transfer among H. influenzae strands via conjugation.

=== Role of transformation ===
H. influenzae mutants defective in their rec1 gene (a homolog of recA) are very susceptible to being killed by the oxidizing agent hydrogen peroxide. This finding suggests that rec1 expression is important for H. influenzae survival under conditions of oxidative stress. Since it is a homolog of recA, rec1 likely plays a key role in recombinational repair of DNA damage. Thus, H. influenzae may protect its genome against the reactive oxygen species produced by the host's phagocytic cells through recombinational repair of oxidative DNA damages. Recombinational repair of a damaged site of a chromosome requires, in addition to rec1, a second homologous undamaged DNA molecule. Individual H. influenzae cells are capable of taking up homologous DNA from other cells by the process of transformation. Transformation in H. influenzae involves at least 15 gene products, and is likely an adaptation for repairing DNA damage in the resident chromosome.

== Culture methods and diagnosis of infections ==
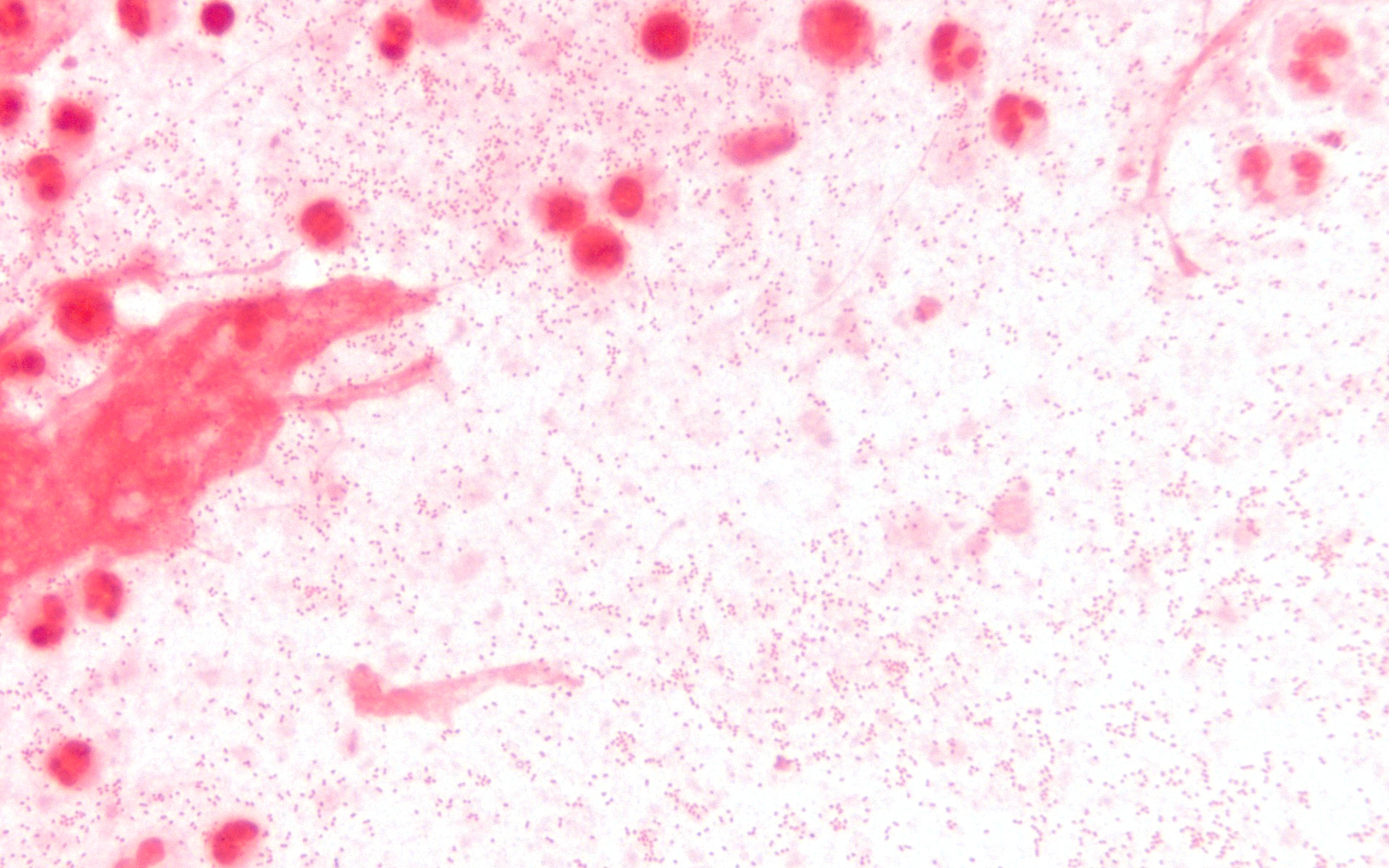
Sputum Gram stain at 1000x magnification. The sputum is from a person with Haemophilus influenzae pneumonia, and the Gram negative coccobacilli are visible with a background of neutrophils.

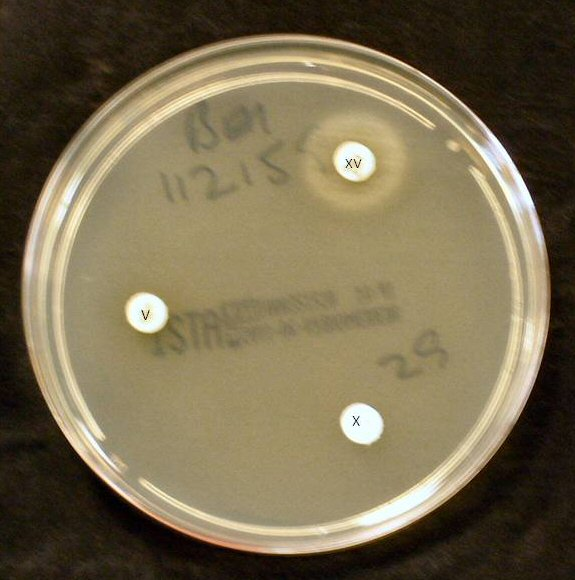
Haemophilus influenzae requires hemin and NAD for growth. In this culture, Haemophilus has only grown around the paper disc that has been impregnated with these factors. No bacterial growth is seen around the discs that only contain either hemin or NAD.

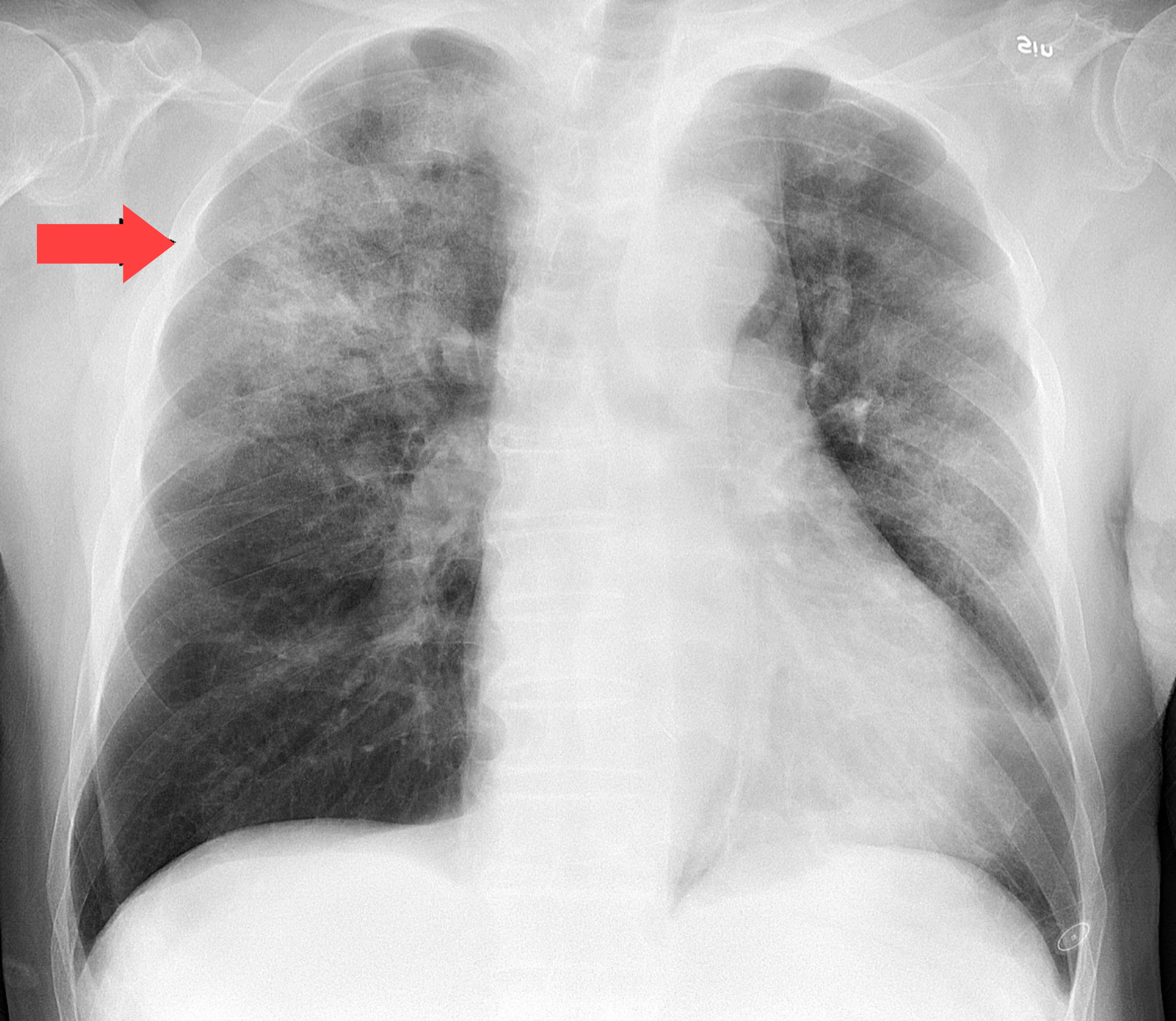
Chest X-ray of a case of Haemophilus influenzae, presumably as a secondary infection from influenza. It shows patchy consolidations, mainly in the right upper lobe (arrow).

Chest X-ray in a case of COPD exacerbation where a nasopharyngeal swab detected Haemophilus influenzae: Opacities (on the patient's right side) can be seen in other types of pneumonia, as well.

=== Culture ===
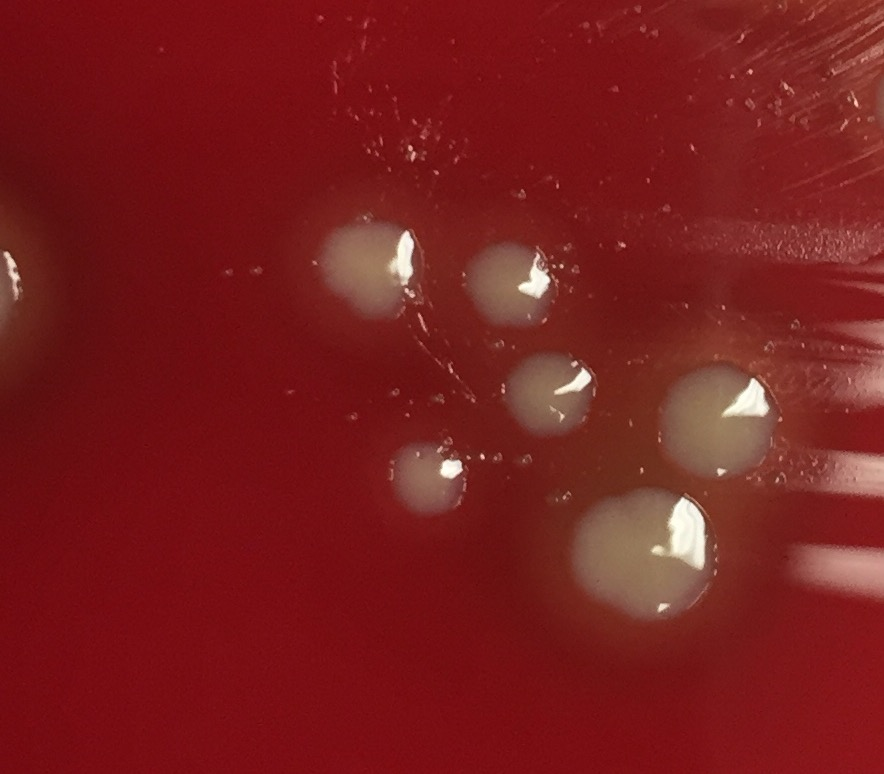
Haemophilus influenzae satellite colonies (pin points) near Staphylococcus aureus (yellow) on blood agar plate

Bacterial culture of H. influenzae is performed on agar plates. The strongest growth is seen on chocolate agar at 37 °C in a CO_{2}-enriched incubator. The ideal CO_{2} concentration for the culture is ~5%. However adequate growth is often seen on brain-heart infusion agar supplemented with hemin and nicotinamide adenine dinucleotide (NAD)

Colonies of H. influenzae appear as convex, smooth, pale, grey, or transparent colonies with a mild odor. H. influenzae will only grow on blood agar if other bacteria are present to release these factors from the red blood cells, forming 'satellite' colonies around these bacteria. For example, H. influenzae will grow in the hemolytic zone of Staphylococcus aureus on blood agar plates; the hemolysis of cells by S. aureus releases NAD which is needed for its growth. H. influenzae will not grow outside the hemolytic zone of S. aureus due to the lack of nutrients in these areas.

=== Diagnosis of infections ===
Clinical features of a respiratory tract infection may include initial symptoms of an upper respiratory tract infection mimicking a viral infection, usually associated with low-grade fevers. This may progress to the lower respiratory tract within a few days, with features often resembling those of wheezy bronchitis. Sputum may be difficult to expectorate and is often grey or creamy in color. The cough may persist for weeks without appropriate treatment. Many cases are diagnosed after presenting chest infections that do not respond to penicillins or first-generation cephalosporins. A chest X-ray can identify alveolar consolidation.

Clinical diagnosis of invasive H. influenzae infection (infection that has spread to the bloodstream and internal tissues) is typically confirmed by bacterial culture, latex particle agglutination tests, or polymerase chain reaction tests on clinical samples obtained from an otherwise sterile body site. In this respect, H. influenzae cultured from the nasopharyngeal cavity or throat would not indicate H. influenzae disease, because these sites are colonized in disease-free individuals.

Although highly specific, bacterial culture of H. influenzae lacks sensitivity. Use of antibiotics prior to sample collection greatly reduces the isolation rate by killing the bacteria before identification is possible. Recent work has shown that H. influenzae uses a highly specialized spectrum of nutrients where lactate is a preferred carbon source.

==== Latex particle agglutination ====
The latex particle agglutination test (LAT) is a more sensitive method to detect H. influenzae than is culture. Because the method relies on antigen rather than viable bacteria, the results are not disrupted by prior antibiotic use. It also has the added benefit of being quicker than culture methods. However, antibiotic sensitivity testing is not possible with LAT alone, so a parallel culture is necessary.

==== Molecular methods ====
Polymerase chain reaction (PCR) assays have been proven to be more sensitive than either LAT or culture tests and are highly specific. These PCR tests can be used for capsular typing of encapsulated H. influenzae strains.

== Pathogenicity ==
=== Host colonization ===
Many microbes colonize within a host organism. Colonization occurs when a microorganism continues to multiply within the host, without interaction, causing no visible signs of illness or infection. H. influenzae colonizes differently in adults than it does young children. Because this bacterium colonizes more rapidly in young children, they are capable of carrying more than one strain of the same bacterium. Once in the adult stage of life, a human is likely to only be carrying one strain as this bacterium does not colonize as aggressively in adults. Nearly all infants will undergo colonization of this bacteria within their first year of life.

H. influenzae is generally found within and upon the human body, but can also live on various dry, hard surfaces for up to 12 days. Most strains of H. influenzae are opportunistic pathogens; that is, they usually live in their host without causing disease, but cause problems only when other factors (such as a viral infection, reduced immune function or chronically inflamed tissues, e.g. from allergies) create an opportunity. They infect the host by sticking to the host cell using trimeric autotransporter adhesins.

The pathogenesis of H. influenzae infections is not completely understood, although the presence of the polyribosyl ribitol phosphate (PRP) capsule in encapsulated type b (Hib), a serotype causing conditions such as epiglottitis, is known to be a major factor in virulence. Their capsule allows them to resist phagocytosis and complement-mediated lysis in the nonimmune host. The unencapsulated strains are almost always less invasive; however, they can produce an inflammatory response in humans, which can lead to many symptoms. Vaccination with Hib conjugate vaccine is effective in preventing Hib infection but does not prevent infection with NTHi strains.

H. influenzae can cause respiratory tract infections (including pneumonia), otitis media, epiglottitis (swelling in the throat), eye infections, bloodstream infection, and meningitis. It can also cause cellulitis (skin infection), infectious arthritis (inflammation of the joint), and non-gonococcal urethritis (NGU).

=== Haemophilus influenzae type b (Hib) infection ===
Naturally acquired disease caused by H. influenzae seems to occur in humans only. In healthy children under the age of 5, H. influenzae type b was responsible for more than 80% of aggressive infections, before the introduction of the [Hib] vaccine. In infants and young children, H. influenzae type b (Hib) causes bacteremia, pneumonia, epiglottitis and acute bacterial meningitis. On occasion, it causes cellulitis, osteomyelitis, and infectious arthritis. It is one cause of neonatal infection.

Due to routine use of the Hib vaccine in the US since 1990, the incidence of invasive Hib disease has decreased to 1.3/100,000 in children. However, Hib remains a major cause of lower respiratory tract infections in infants and children in developing countries where the vaccine is not widely used. Unencapsulated H. influenzae strains are unaffected by the Hib vaccine and cause ear infections (otitis media), eye infections (conjunctivitis), and sinusitis in children, and are associated with pneumonia.

== Treatment ==
Some strains of H. influenzae produce beta-lactamases, and are also able to modify its penicillin-binding proteins, so the bacteria have gained resistance to the penicillin family of antibiotics. In severe cases, cefotaxime and ceftriaxone delivered directly into the bloodstream are the elected antibiotics, and, for the less severe cases, an association of ampicillin and sulbactam, cephalosporins of the second and third generation, or fluoroquinolones are preferred. (Fluoroquinolone-resistant strains of H. influenzae have been observed).

Macrolides and fluoroquinolones have activity against non-typeable H. influenzae and could be used in patients with a history of allergy to beta-lactam antibiotics. However, macrolide resistance has also been observed.

== Serious and chronic complications ==
The serious complications of HiB are brain damage, hearing loss, and even death. While non-typable H. influenzae strains rarely cause serious disease, they are more likely to cause chronic infections because they have the ability to change their surface antigens. Chronic infections are usually not as serious as acute infections.

There are a few other possible diseases and conditions that can arise from the H. influenzae depending on the areas that they exist in within the human body. This bacterium can exist in the nasal passages (especially the nasopharynx), the ear canal, and the lungs. The bacterium's presence in these areas can lead to some conditions such as otitis media, chronic obstructive pulmonary disorder (COPD), epiglottitis, and asthma which can become severe.

== Vaccination ==
Hib vaccine

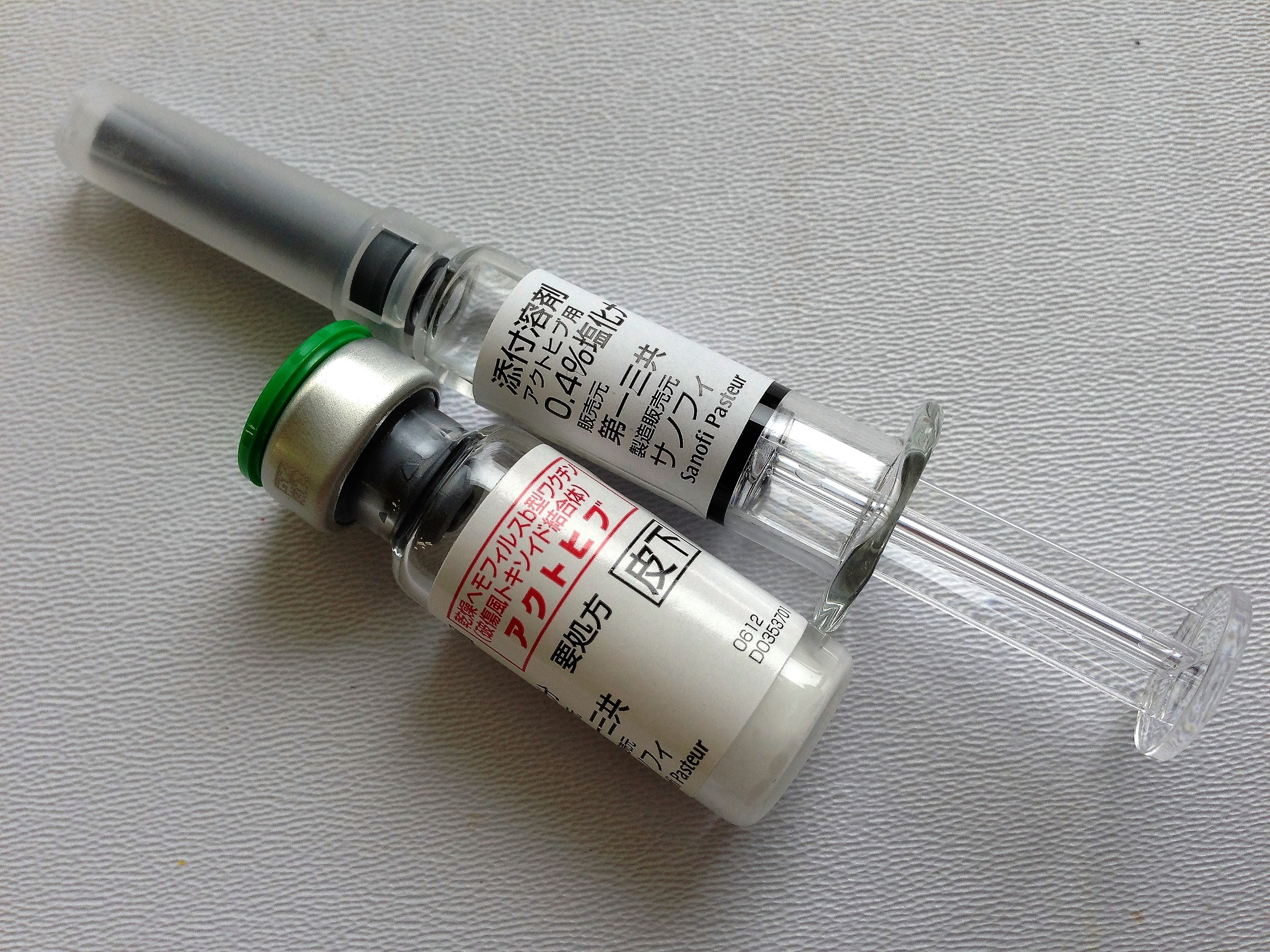
ActHIB (Hib-vaccine)

Effective vaccines for Haemophilus influenzae serotype b have been available since the early 1990s, and are recommended for children under age 5 and asplenic patients. The World Health Organization recommends a pentavalent vaccine, combining vaccines against diphtheria, tetanus, pertussis, hepatitis B and Hib. There is not yet sufficient evidence on how effective this pentavalent vaccine is in relation to the individual vaccines.

Hib vaccines cost about seven times the total cost of vaccines against measles, polio, tuberculosis, diphtheria, tetanus, and pertussis. Consequently, whereas 92% of the populations of developed countries, 94% for European countries, were vaccinated against Hib as of 2023, vaccination coverage was 77% globally, and only 33% for people living in the western pacific region.

The Hib vaccines do not provide cross-protection to any other H. influenzae serotypes like Hia, Hic, Hid, Hie or Hif.

An oral vaccination has been developed for non-typeable H. influenzae (NTHi) for patients with chronic bronchitis, but it has not shown to be effective in reducing the number and severity of COPD exacerbations. However, there is no effective vaccine for the other types of capsulated H. influenzae or NTHi.

Vaccines that target unencapsulated H. influenzae serotypes are in development.

By 2026, following the decline of vaccinations in the United States, Hib was confirmed to be making a comeback in the country.

== See also ==
- Hattie Alexander
- Haemophilus influenzae cellulitis
- Haemophilus meningitis
- Maurice Hilleman
- Trimeric Autotransporter Adhesins (TAA)
