= Cutaneous group B streptococcal infection =

- Specialty: Infectious diseases

Cutaneous group B streptococcal infection may result in orbital cellulitis or facial erysipelas in neonates.

== See also ==
- Skin lesion
