= Haemophilus influenzae cellulitis =

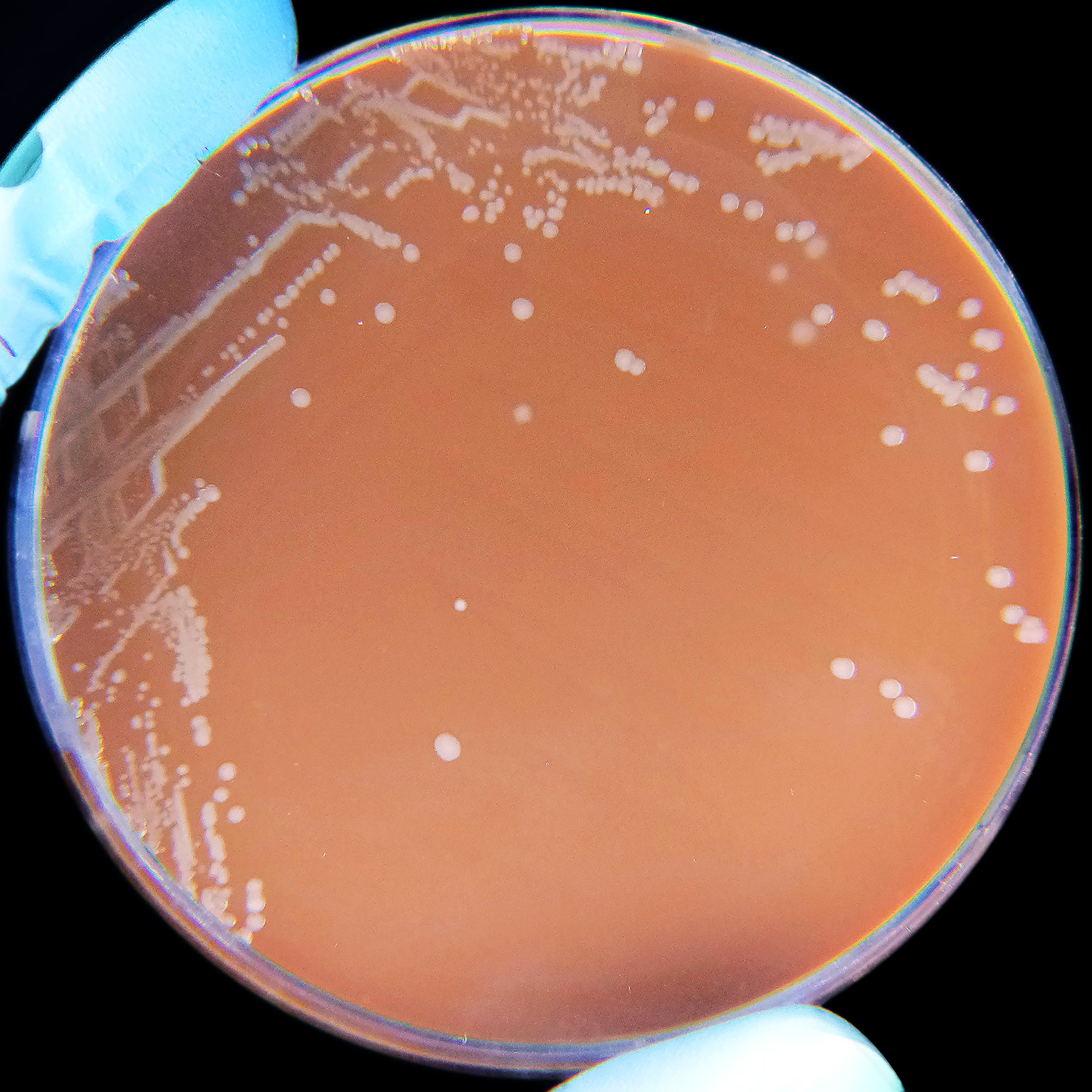
- Haemophilus influenzae colonies growing on the chocolate agar.
- Specialty: Dermatology

Haemophilus influenzae cellulitis is a cutaneous condition characterized by a distinctive bluish or purplish-red cellulitis of the face.

== See also ==
- Haemophilus influenzae
- Skin lesion
