= Haemophilus meningitis =

- Specialty: Neurology

Haemophilus meningitis is a form of bacterial meningitis caused by the Haemophilus influenzae bacteria. It is usually (but not always) associated with Haemophilus influenzae type b.

Meningitis involves the inflammation of the protective membranes that cover the brain and spinal cord. Haemophilus meningitis is characterized by symptoms including fever, nausea, sensitivity to light, headaches, stiff neck, anorexia, and seizures. Haemophilus meningitis can be deadly, but antibiotics are effective in treating the infection, especially when cases are caught early enough that the inflammation has not done a great deal of damage. Before the introduction of the Hib vaccine in 1985, Haemophilus meningitis was the leading cause of bacterial meningitis in children under the age of five. However, since the creation of the Hib vaccine, only two in every 100,000 children contract this type of meningitis.

Five to ten percent of cases can be fatal, although the average mortality rate in developing nations is seventeen percent, mostly due to lack of access to vaccination as well as lack of access to medical care needed to combat the meningitis.

== Symptoms and signs ==
Possible symptoms of Haemophilus meningitis include:

- Nausea or vomiting
- Fever
- Headache
- Sensitivity to light
- Seizures
- Anorexia
- Change in mental status, such as irritability
- Stiff neck

== Risk factors ==
While the Haemophilus influenzae bacteria are unable to survive in any environment outside of the human body, humans can carry the bacteria within their bodies without developing any symptoms of the disease. The bacterium spreads through the air when an individual carrying the bacteria coughs or sneezes. The risk of developing Haemophilus meningitis is most directly related to an individual's vaccination history, as well as the vaccination history of the general public. Herd immunity, or the protection that unvaccinated individuals experience when the majority of others in their proximity are vaccinated, does help in the reduction of meningitis cases, but it does not guarantee protection from the disease. Contact with other individuals with the disease also vastly increases the risk of infection. A child in the presence of family members sick with Haemophilus meningitis or carrying the bacteria is 585 times more likely to catch Haemophilus meningitis. Additionally, siblings of individuals with Haemophilus influenzae meningitis receive reduced benefits from certain types of immunization. Similarly, children under two years of age have a greater risk of contracting the disease when attending day care, especially in their first month of attendance, due to the maintained contact with other children who might be asymptomatic carriers of the Hib bacteria.

== Prevention ==
Before the widespread use of the Hib vaccine, Haemophilus meningitis accounted for 40%-60% of all meningitis cases in children under the age of fifteen, and 90% of all meningitis cases in children under the age of five. Vaccination can reduce incidence. Vaccination has reduced the occurrences of Haemophilus meningitis by 87-90% in countries with widespread access to the Hib vaccine. Rates are still high in areas with limited levels of vaccination. Less-developed countries as well as countries with medical infrastructure that has been damaged in any way, such as from warfare, do not have such widespread access to the vaccine and thus experience higher rates of meningitis cases. Multiple conjugate Hib vaccines are available for use, though, and are extremely effective when given to infants. Additionally, the vaccine has only the side effects of reddened skin and swelling at the location of the injection.

== Treatment ==
Because it is a bacterial disease, the primary method of treatment for Haemophilus meningitis is anti-bacterial therapy. Common antibiotics include ceftriaxone or cefotaxime, both of which can combat the infection and thus reduce inflammation in the meninges, or the membranes that protect the brain and spinal cord. Anti-inflammatories such as corticosteroids, or steroids produced by the body to reduce inflammation, can also be used to fight the meningeal inflammation in an attempt to reduce risk of mortality and reduce the possibility of brain damage.

== Prognosis ==
Survivors of Haemophilus meningitis may experience permanent damage caused by inflammation around the brain, mostly involving neurological disorders. Long-term complications include brain damage, hearing loss, and mental disability. Other possible long-term effects are reduced IQ, cerebral palsy, and the development of seizures. Children that survive the disease are more often held back in school, and are more likely to require special education services. Negative long-term effects are more likely in subjects whose treatments were delayed, as well as in subjects who were given antibiotics to which the bacteria was resistant. Ten percent of survivors develop epilepsy, while close to twenty percent of survivors develop hearing loss ranging from mild loss to deafness. About 45% of survivors experience no negative long-term effects.
