= Lupus vulgaris =

Painful facial skin nodules due to infection by M. tuberculosis

- Other names: Tuberculosis luposa
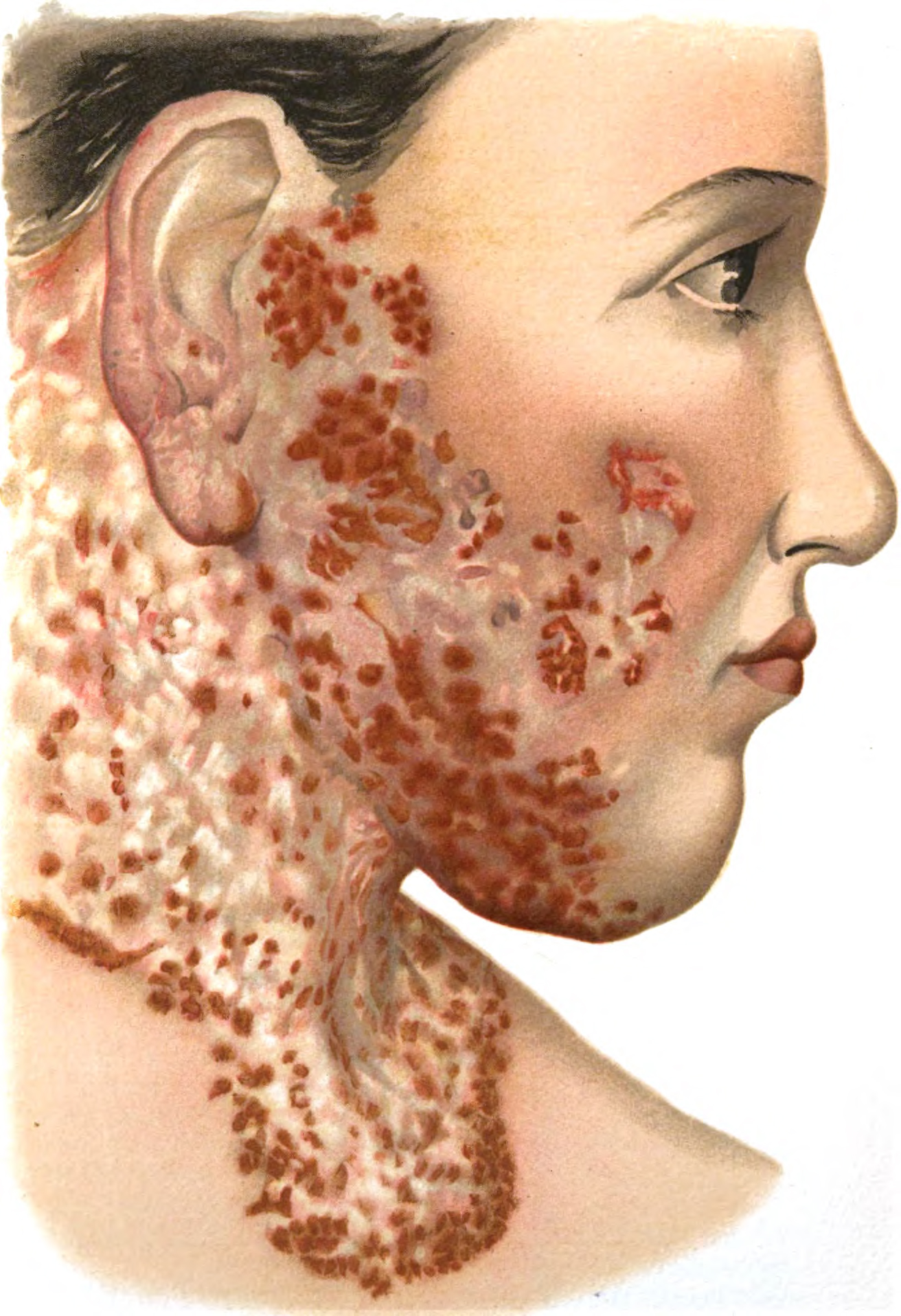
- Lupus vulgaris
- Specialty: Infectious disease

Lupus vulgaris (also known as tuberculosis luposa) are painful cutaneous tuberculosis skin lesions with nodular appearance, most often on the face around the nose, eyelids, lips, cheeks, ears and neck. It is the most common Mycobacterium tuberculosis skin infection. The lesions may ultimately develop into disfiguring skin ulcers if left untreated.

== Signs and symptoms ==
It begins as painless reddish-brown nodules which slowly enlarge to form irregularly shaped red plaque.

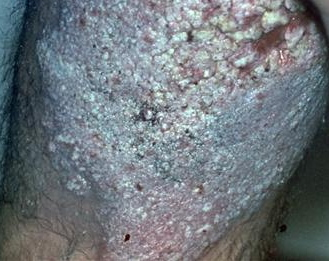
Lupus vulgaris, changes in skin in hyperkeratotic forms

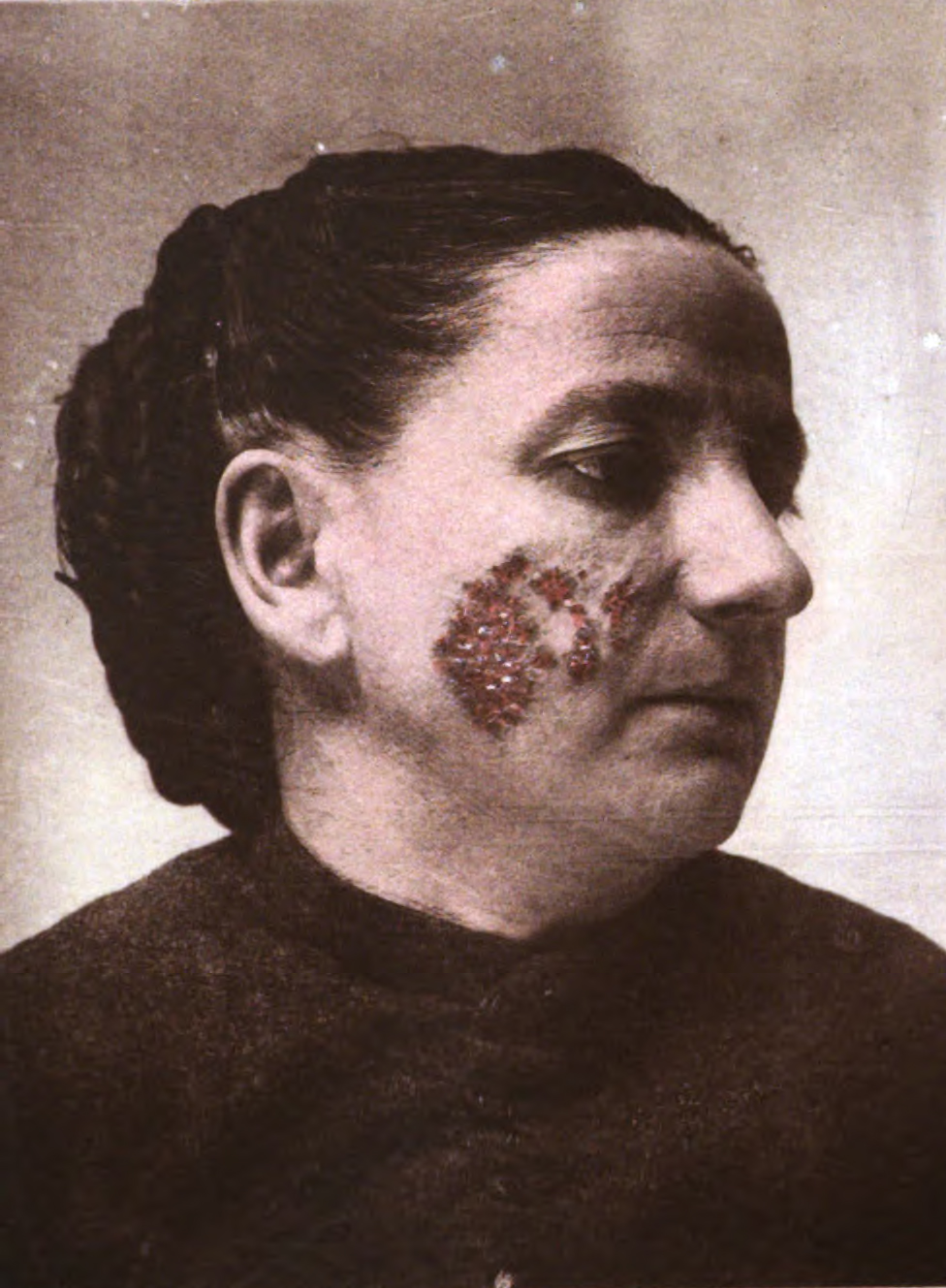
Lupus vulgaris in a woman, late 19th century

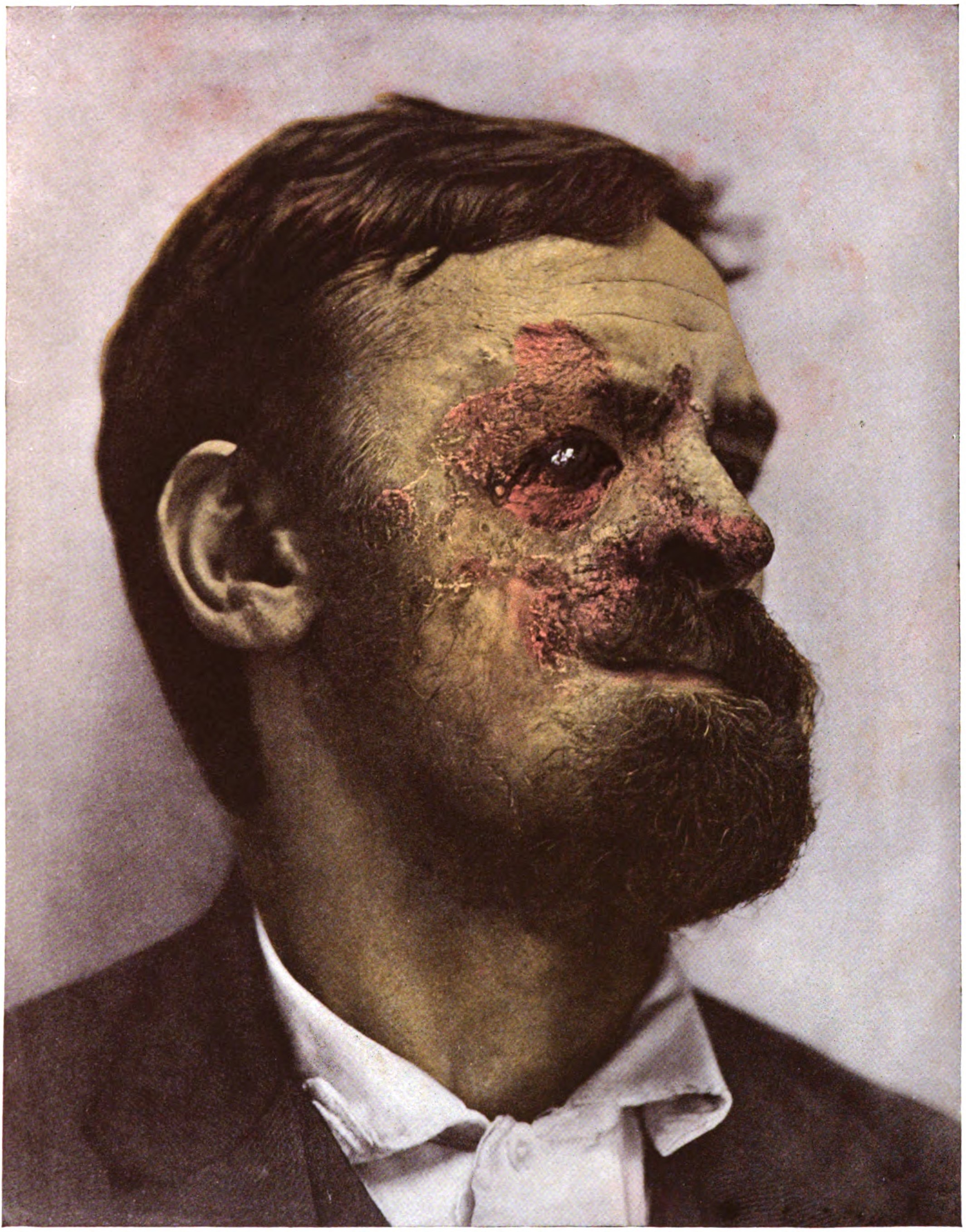
Lupus vulgaris in a man, c. 1900

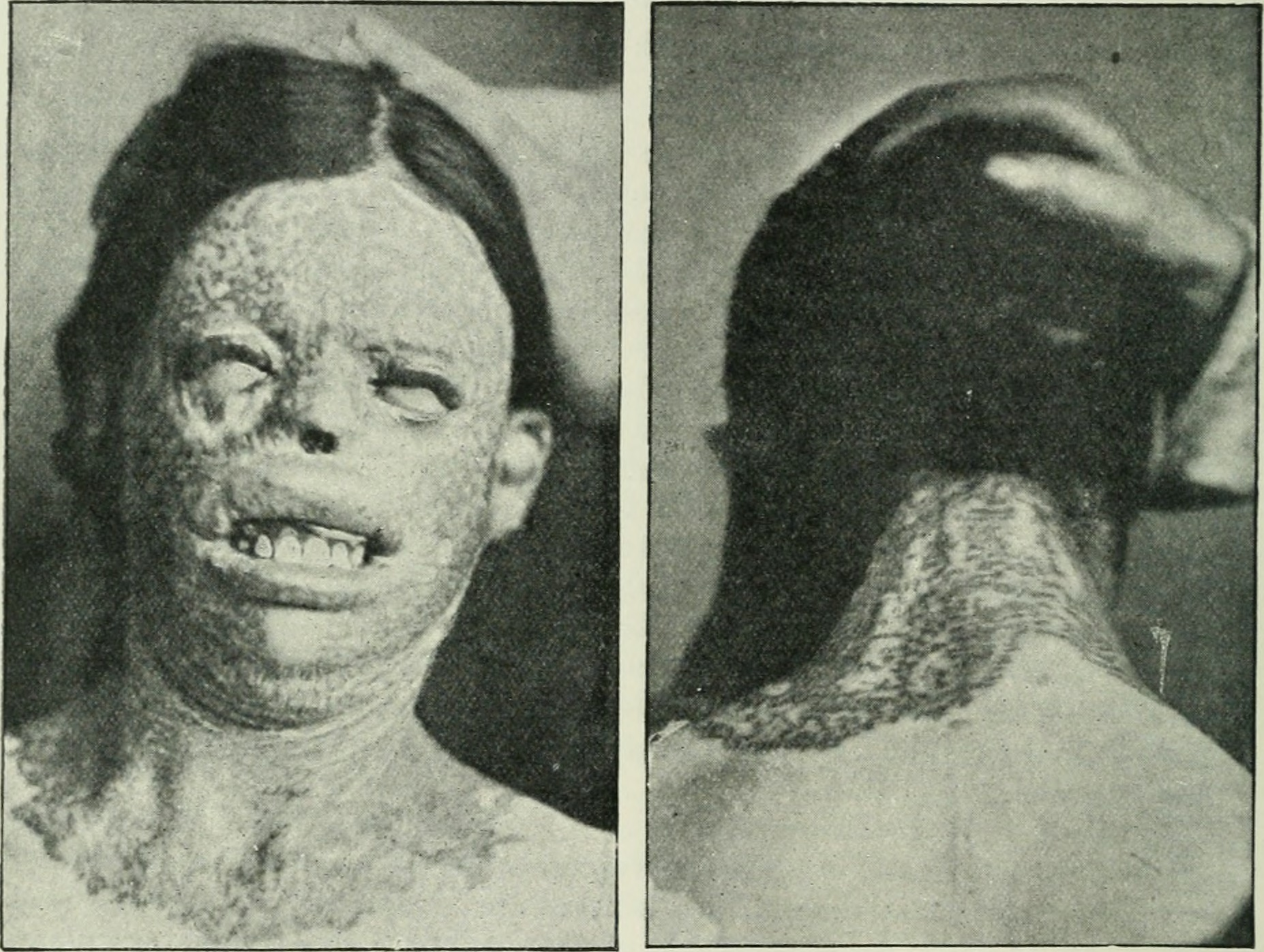
Advanced lupus vulgaris over the entire face and neck

== Cause ==
Lupus vulgaris often develops due to inadequately treated pre-existing tuberculosis. It may also develop at site of BCG vaccination. Rarely, it has been shown to be associated with tattoo marks.

== Histopathology ==
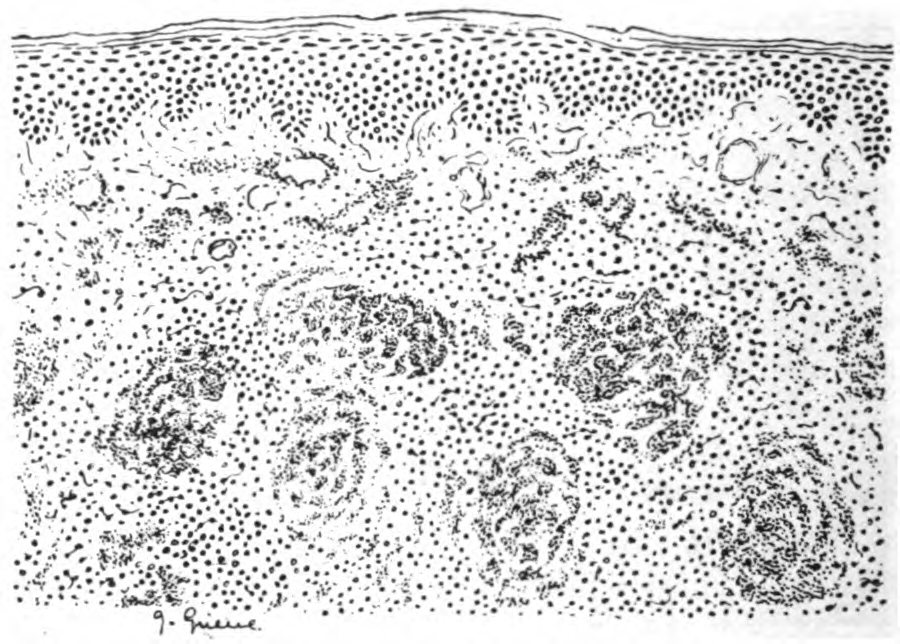
Dermis showing well-formed granulomas with necrotic centers

Histologically, it shows presence of epithelioid cell granulomas with Langhans giant cells with or without central caseation necrosis in the dermis.

== Diagnosis ==
On diascopy, it shows characteristic "apple-jelly" color. Biopsy will reveal tuberculoid granuloma with few bacilli. Mantoux test is positive.

=== Differential diagnosis ===
The condition should be distinguished from:

- Basal-cell carcinoma
- Sarcoidosis
- Discoid lupus erythomatosus
- Leprosy
- Deep fungal infection

== Management ==
A dermatologist or general physician usually administers combination therapy of drugs used for tuberculosis, such as rifampicin, isoniazid, and pyrazinamide (possibly with either streptomycin or ethambutol). Adequate vitamin D, from sufficient sunlight or supplements, prevents and cures Lupus vulgaris. (Holick MF, 2010. The vitamin D solution, P10.)

== Prognosis ==
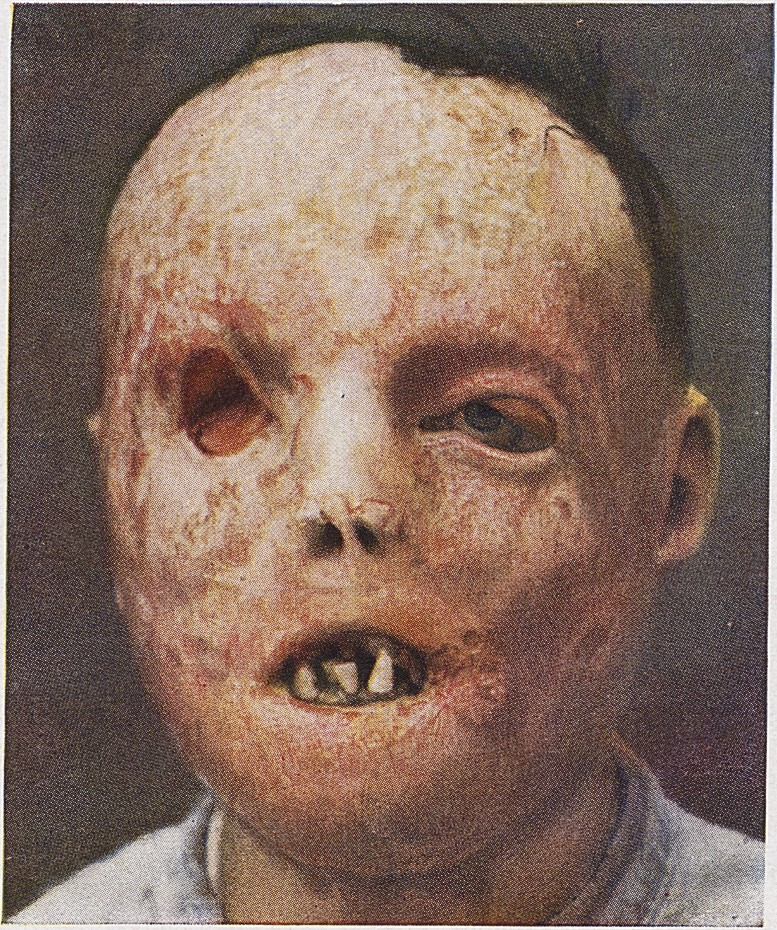
Severe lupus vulgaris with carcinoma on left side of mouth

In longstanding scarred lesions, squamous-cell carcinoma can develop.

== History ==
In the 19th century, the chronic and progressive nature of this disease was particularly marked: it remained active for ten years, twenty years, or even longer and, proved resistant to all treatment until the breakthrough by Niels Ryberg Finsen using a form of "concentrated light radiation" or light therapy (now known as photobiomodulation) which won him a Nobel Prize.

The inscription on a bronze statue of Queen Alexandra of Great Britain, (1844–1925), consort to Edward VII, at the Royal London Hospital, notes that she "introduced to England the Finsen light cure for Lupus, and presented the first lamp to this hospital".

=== Etymology ===
The term "lupus" (meaning "wolf" in Latin) to describe an ulcerative skin disease dates to the late thirteenth century, though it was not until the mid-nineteenth that two specific skin diseases were classified as lupus erythematosus and lupus vulgaris. The term may derive from the rapacity and virulence of the disease; a 1590 work described it as "a malignant ulcer quickly consuming the neather parts; ... very hungry like unto a woolfe".

== See also ==
- Miliary tuberculosis
- Tuberculous gumma (metastatic tuberculous abscess or ulceration)
- List of skin conditions
