= Tuberculosis cutis orificialis =

- Other names: Orificial tuberculosis or acute tuberculous ulcer.
- Specialty: Dermatology

Tuberculosis cutis orificialis, also known as acute tuberculous ulcer or orificial tuberculosis,) is a form of cutaneous tuberculosis that occurs at the mucocutaneous borders of the nose, mouth, anus, urinary meatus, and vagina, and on the mucous membrane of the mouth or tongue.

== See also ==
- Scrofuloderma
- Skin lesion
- List of cutaneous conditions
