= Latex fixation test =

Assay for microorganisms

- MeSH: D007841
- MedlinePlus: 003334

A latex fixation test, also called a latex agglutination assay or test (LA assay or test), is an assay used clinically in the identification and typing of many important microorganisms. These tests use the patient's antigen-antibody immune response. This response occurs when the body detects a pathogen and forms an antibody specific to an identified antigen (a protein configuration) present on the surface of the pathogen.

Agglutination tests, specific to a variety of pathogens, can be designed and manufactured for clinicians by coating microbeads of latex with pathogen-specific antigens or antibodies. In performing a test, laboratory clinicians will mix a patient's cerebrospinal fluid, serum or urine with the coated latex particles in serial dilutions with normal saline (important to avoid the prozone effect) and observe for agglutination (clumping). Agglutination of the beads in any of the dilutions is considered a positive result, confirming either that the patient's body has produced the pathogen-specific antibody (if the test supplied the antigen) or that the specimen contains the pathogen's antigen (if the test supplied the antibody). Instances of cross-reactivity (where the antibody sticks to another antigen besides the antigen of interest) can lead to confusing results.

Agglutination techniques are used to detect antibodies produced in response to a variety of viruses and bacteria, as well as autoantibodies, which are produced against the self in autoimmune diseases. For example, assays exist for rubella virus, rotavirus, and rheumatoid factor, and an excellent LA test is available for cryptococcus. Agglutination techniques are also used in definitive diagnosis of group A streptococcal infection.

== See also ==
- Visceral leishmaniasis § Diagnosis
