= Tuberculous gumma =

- Other names: Metastatic tuberculous abscess, metastatic tuberculous ulcer
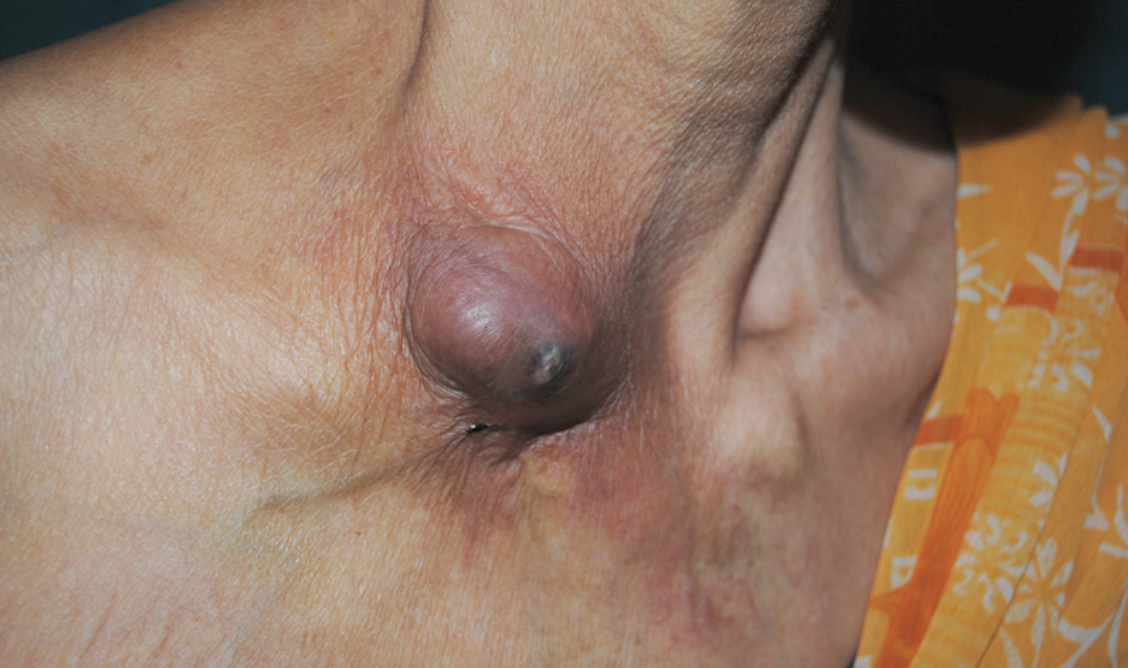
- Specialty: Infectious disease

Tuberculous gumma is a skin condition characterized histologically by massive necrosis. Restated, this is a skin condition that results from hematogenous dissemination of mycobacteria from a primary focus, resulting in firm, nontender erythematous nodules that soften, ulcerate, and form sinuses.

== See also ==
- Tuberculosis verrucosa cutis
- Tuberculosis cutis orificialis
- List of cutaneous conditions
