= Cellulitis =

Bacterial infection

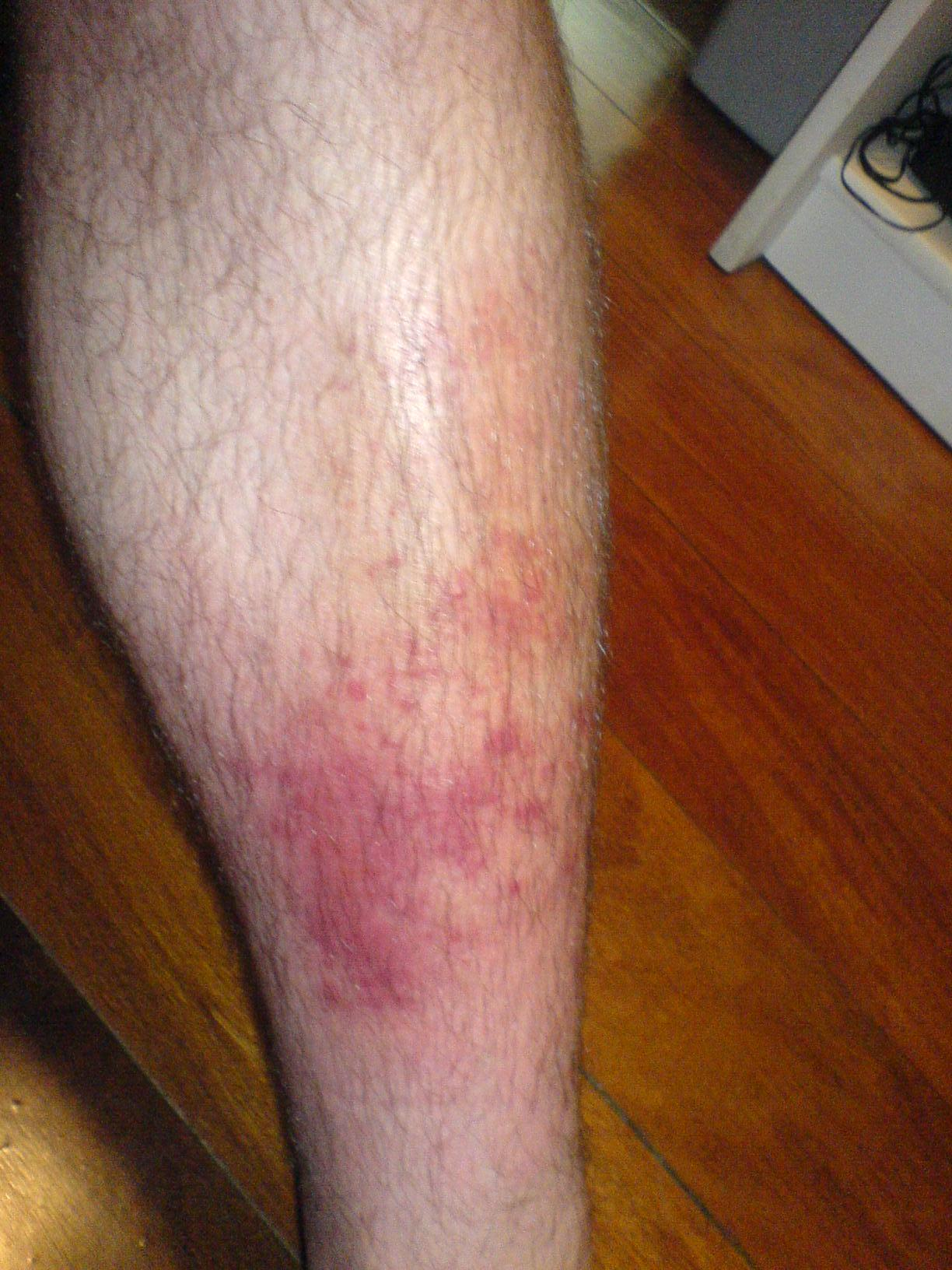
- Skin cellulitis
- Specialty: Infectious disease, dermatology
- Symptoms: Red, hot, painful area of skin, fever
- Duration: 7–10 days
- Causes: Bacteria
- Risk factors: Break in the skin, obesity, leg swelling, old age
- Diagnostic method: Based on symptoms
- Differential diagnosis: Deep vein thrombosis, stasis dermatitis, erysipelas, Lyme disease, necrotizing fasciitis. Sepsis must be ruled out, and if it occurs, it must be rapidly treated.
- Treatment: Elevation of the affected area
- Medication: Antibiotics such as cephalexin
- Frequency: 21.2 million (2015)
- Deaths: 16,900 (2015)

Cellulitis is usually a bacterial infection involving the inner layers of the skin. It specifically affects the dermis and subcutaneous fat. Signs and symptoms include an area of redness that increases in size over a few days. The borders of the area of redness are generally not sharp, and the skin may be swollen. While the redness often turns white when pressure is applied, this is not always the case. The area of infection is usually painful. Lymphatic vessels may occasionally be involved, and the person may have a fever and feel tired.

The legs and face are the most common sites involved, although cellulitis can occur anywhere on the body. The leg is typically affected following a break in the skin from abrasions, arthropod bites, or maceration between the toes. Other risk factors include obesity, leg swelling, and old age. For facial infections, a break in the skin beforehand is not usually the case. The bacteria most commonly involved are streptococci and Staphylococcus aureus.

In contrast to cellulitis, erysipelas is a bacterial infection involving the more superficial layers of the skin, present with an area of redness with well-defined edges, and is more often associated with a fever. The diagnosis is usually based on the presenting signs and symptoms, while a cell culture is rarely possible. Before making a diagnosis, more serious infections such as an underlying bone infection or necrotizing fasciitis should be ruled out.

Treatment is typically with antibiotics taken by mouth, such as cephalexin, amoxicillin or cloxacillin. Those who are allergic to penicillin may be prescribed erythromycin or clindamycin instead. When methicillin-resistant S. aureus (MRSA) is a concern, doxycycline or trimethoprim/sulfamethoxazole may, in addition, be recommended. There is concern related to the presence of pus or previous MRSA infections. Elevating the infected area may be useful, as may pain killers.

Potential complications include abscess formation. Around 95% of people are better after 7 to 10 days of treatment. Those with diabetes, however, often have worse outcomes. Cellulitis occurred in about 21.2 million people in 2015. In the United States about 2 of every 1,000 people per year have a case affecting the lower leg. Cellulitis in 2015 resulted in about 16,900 deaths worldwide. In the United Kingdom, cellulitis was the reason for 1.6% of admissions to a hospital.

== Signs and symptoms ==
The typical signs and symptoms of cellulitis are an area that is red, hot, and painful. The photos shown here are of mild to moderate cases and are not representative of the earlier stages of the condition.

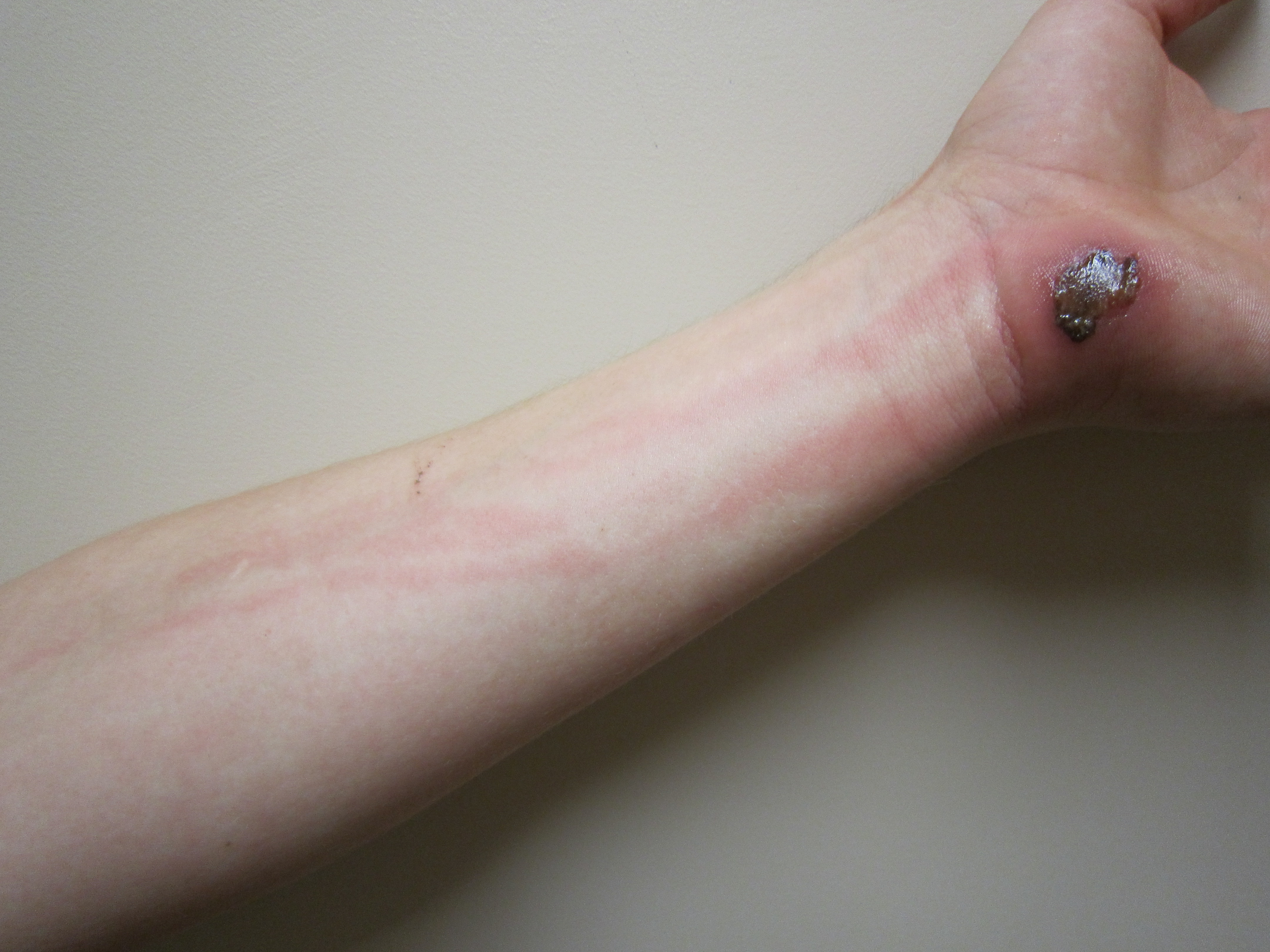
Cellulitis following an abrasion: Note the red streaking up the arm from the involvement of the lymphatic system.

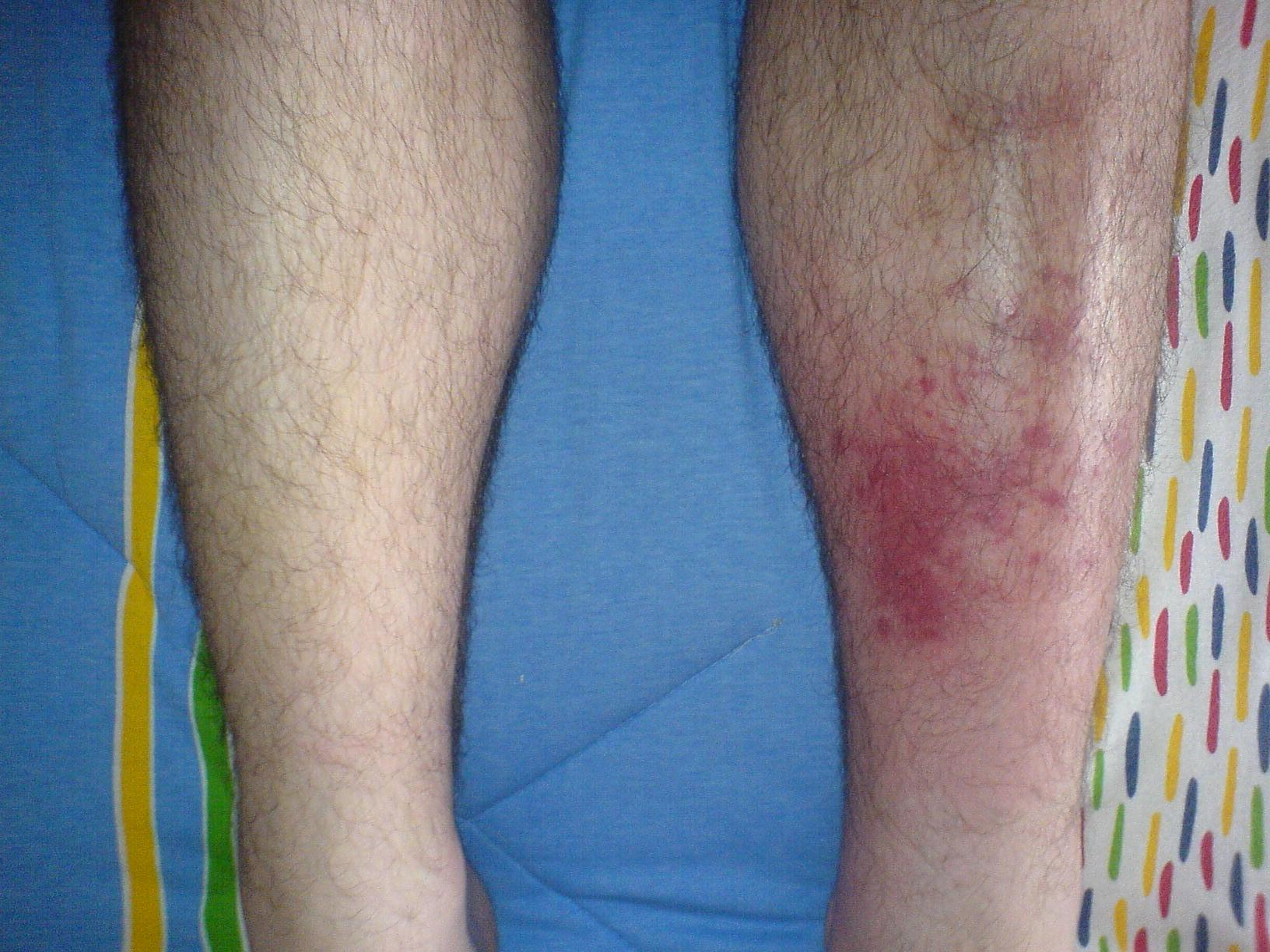
Infected left shin in comparison to the right-sided shin with no sign of symptoms.

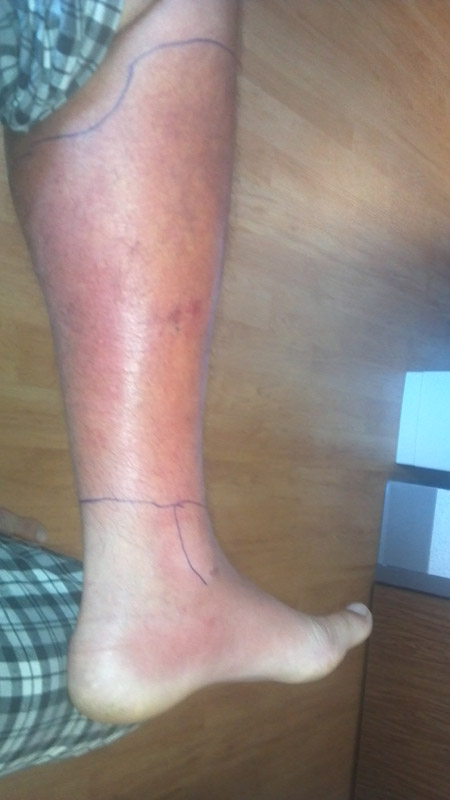
Cellulitis of the leg with foot involvement.

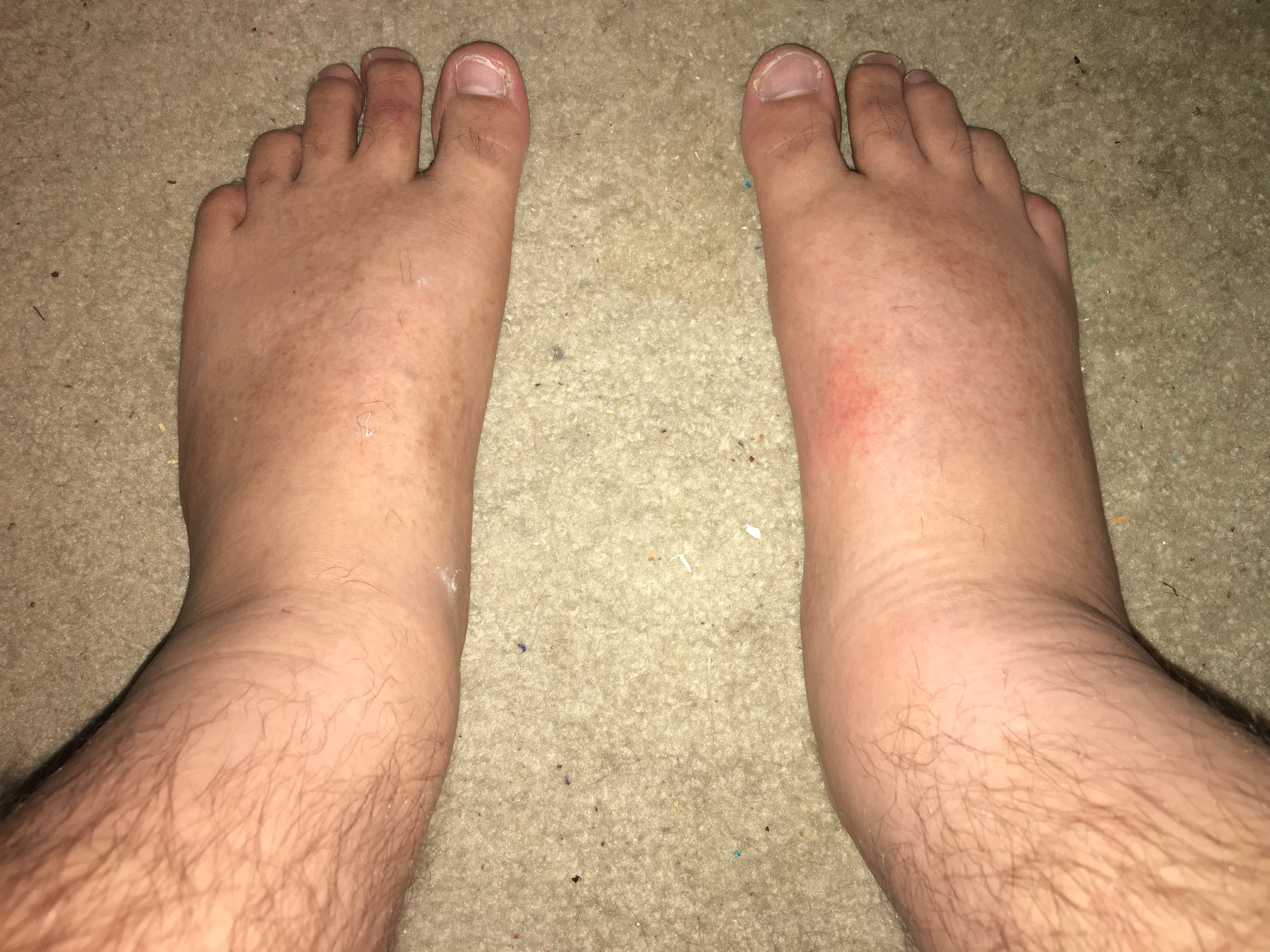
Cellulitis of lower leg and foot

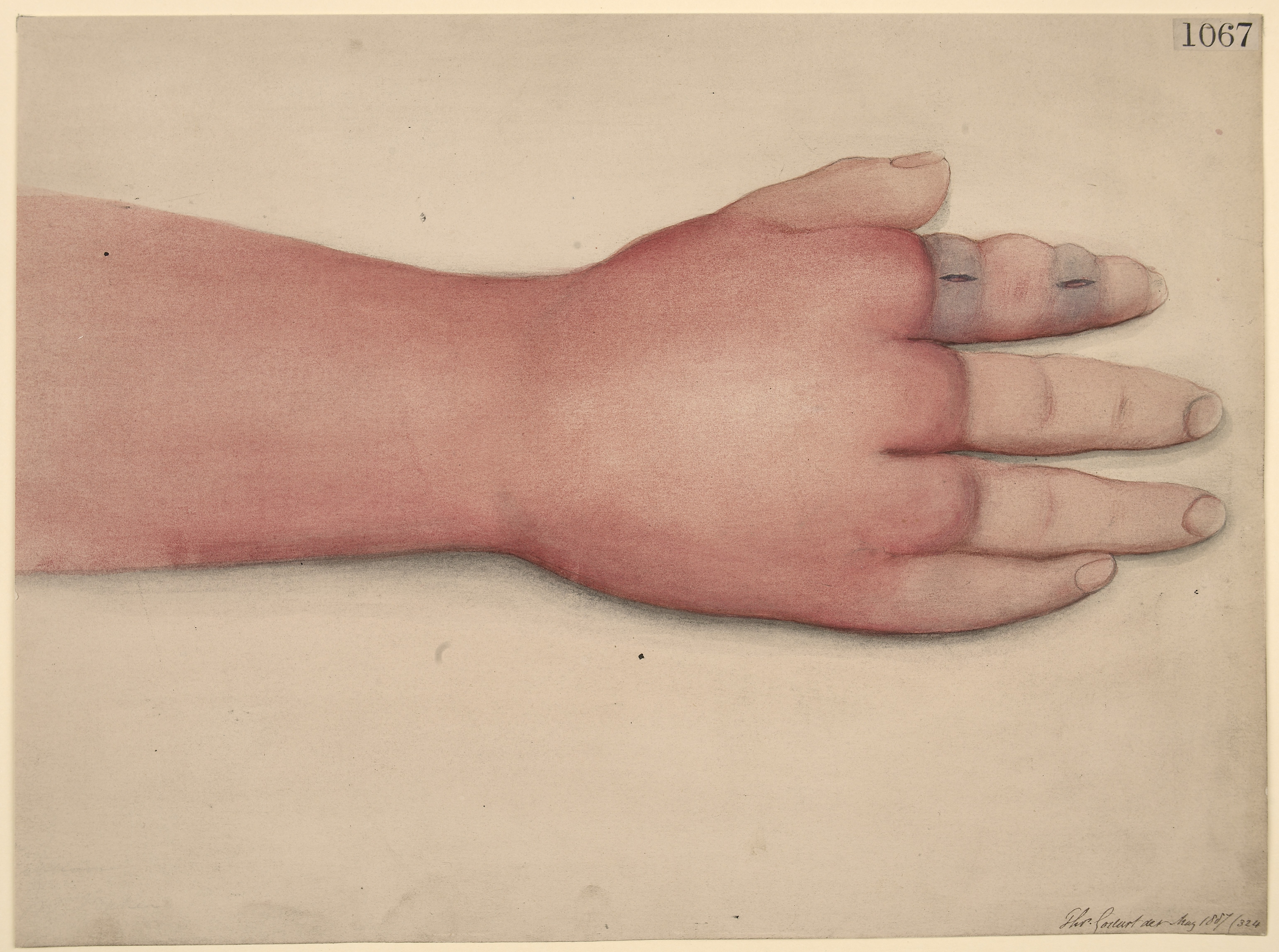
Hand with cellulitis following upon a poisoned wound

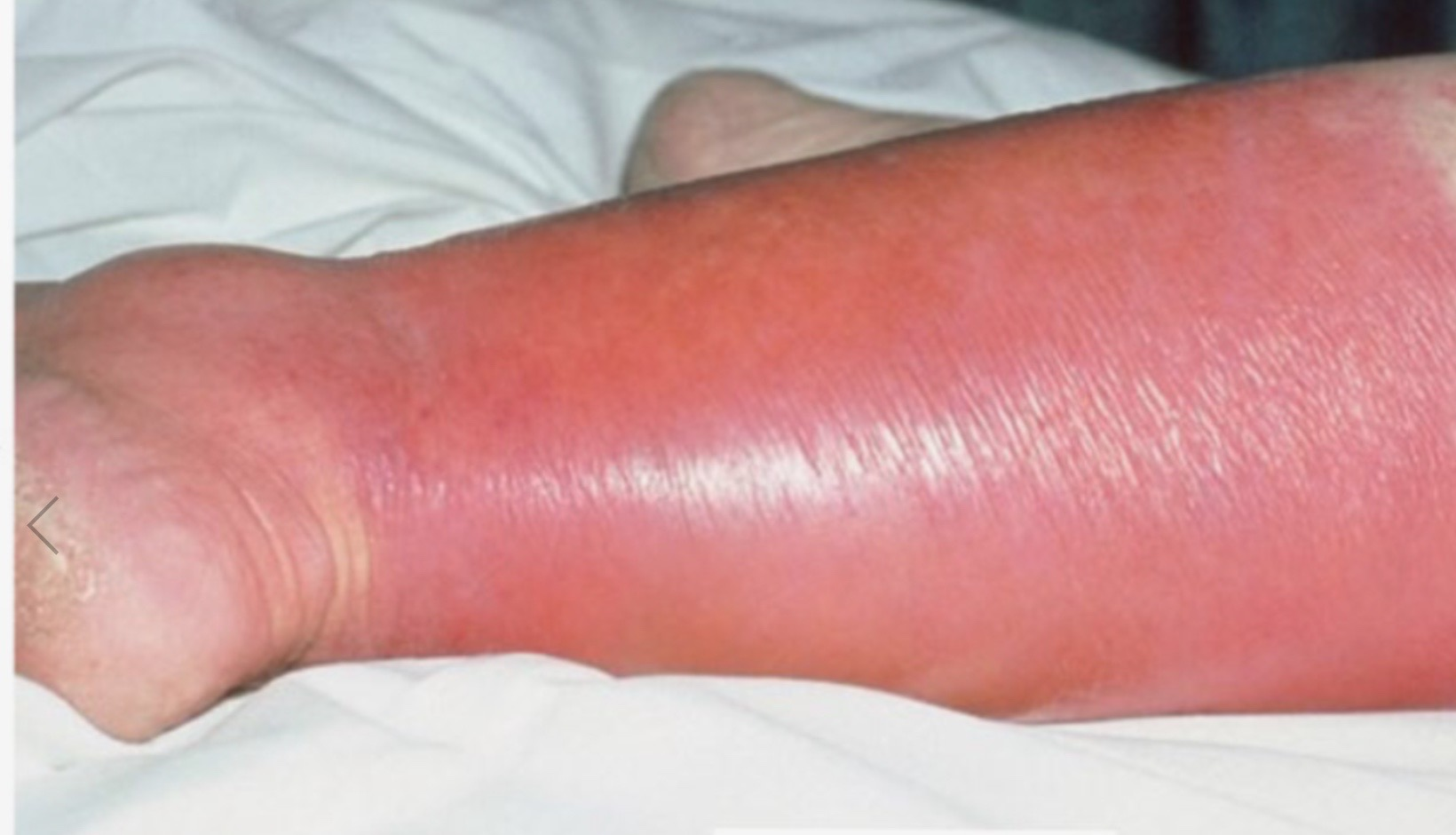
Severe cellulitis of leg

=== Complications ===
Potential complications may include abscess formation, fasciitis, and sepsis.

== Causes ==
Cellulitis is usually, but not always, caused by bacteria that enter and infect the tissue through breaks in the skin. Group A Streptococcus and Staphylococcus are the most common causes of the infection and may be found on the skin as normal biota in healthy individuals.

About 80% of cases of Ludwig's angina, or cellulitis of the submandibular space, are caused by dental infections. Mixed infections, both aerobic and anaerobic bacteria, are commonly associated with this type of cellulitis. Typically, this includes alpha-hemolytic streptococci, staphylococci, and bacteroides' groups.

Predisposing conditions for cellulitis include an insect or spider bite, blistering, an animal bite, tattoos, pruritic (itchy) skin rash, recent surgery, athlete's foot, dry skin, eczema, injecting drugs (especially subcutaneous or intramuscular injection or where an attempted intravenous injection "misses" or blows the vein), pregnancy, diabetes, and obesity, which can affect circulation, as well as burns and boils, although debate exists as to whether minor foot lesions contribute. Occurrences of cellulitis may also be associated with the rare condition hidradenitis suppurativa or dissecting cellulitis.

The appearance of the skin assists in determining a diagnosis. Blood tests, a wound culture, or other tests may be carried out to help rule out a blood clot deep in the veins of the legs. Cellulitis in the lower leg is characterized by signs and symptoms similar to those of a deep vein thrombosis, such as warmth, pain, and swelling (inflammation).

Reddened skin or rash may signal a deeper, more serious infection of the inner layers of skin. Once below the skin, the bacteria can spread rapidly, entering the lymph nodes and the bloodstream and spreading throughout the body. This can result in influenza-like symptoms, with a high temperature and sweating or feeling very cold with shaking, as the affected person cannot get warm.

In rare cases, the infection can spread to the deep layer of tissue called the fascial lining. Necrotizing fasciitis, also called by the media "flesh-eating bacteria", is an example of a deep-layer infection; it is a medical emergency.

=== Risk factors ===
The elderly and those with a weakened immune system are especially vulnerable to contracting cellulitis. Diabetics are more susceptible to cellulitis than the general population because of impairment of the immune system; they are especially prone to cellulitis in the feet, because the disease causes impairment of blood circulation in the legs, leading to diabetic foot or foot ulcers. Neural degeneration in diabetes may cause these ulcers not to be painful, and so remain untreated and become infected. Poor control of blood glucose levels allows bacteria to grow more rapidly in the affected tissue, and, if the infection enters the bloodstream, also facilitates rapid progression. People who have had poliomyelitis are also prone because of circulatory problems, especially in the legs.

Immunosuppressive drugs and other illnesses or infections that weaken the immune system also make infection more likely. Chickenpox and shingles often cause blisters that break open, providing a break in the skin through which bacteria can enter. Lymphedema, which causes swelling on the arms and/or legs, can also put an individual at risk. Diseases that affect blood circulation in the legs and feet, such as chronic venous insufficiency and varicose veins, are also risk factors for cellulitis.

== Diagnosis ==
Cellulitis is most often a clinical diagnosis, readily identified in many people by history and physical examination alone, with rapidly spreading areas of cutaneous swelling, redness, and heat, occasionally associated with inflammation of regional lymph nodes. While classically distinguished as a separate entity from erysipelas by spreading more deeply to involve the subcutaneous tissues, many clinicians may classify erysipelas as cellulitis. Both are often treated similarly, but cellulitis associated with furuncles, carbuncles, or abscesses is usually caused by S. aureus, which may affect treatment decisions, especially antibiotic selection. Skin aspiration of nonpurulent cellulitis, usually caused by streptococcal organisms, is rarely helpful for diagnosis, and blood cultures are positive in fewer than 5% of all cases.

It is important to evaluate for coexisting abscess, as this finding usually requires surgical drainage as opposed to antibiotic therapy alone. Physicians' clinical assessment for abscess may be limited, especially in cases with extensive overlying induration, but the use of bedside ultrasonography performed by an experienced practitioner readily discriminates between abscess and cellulitis and may change management in up to 56% of cases. Use of ultrasound for abscess identification may also be indicated in cases of antibiotic failure. Cellulitis has a characteristic "cobblestoned" appearance indicative of subcutaneous edema without a defined hypoechoic, heterogeneous fluid collection that would indicate abscess.

=== Differential diagnosis ===
Other conditions that may mimic cellulitis include deep vein thrombosis, which can be diagnosed with a compression leg ultrasound, and stasis dermatitis, which is inflammation of the skin from poor blood flow. Signs of a more severe infection, such as necrotizing fasciitis or gas gangrene that would require prompt surgical intervention, include purple bullae, skin sloughing, subcutaneous edema, and systemic toxicity. Misdiagnosis can occur in up to 30% of people with suspected lower-extremity cellulitis, leading to 50,000 to 130,000 unnecessary hospitalizations and $195 to $515 million in avoidable healthcare spending annually in the United States. Evaluation by dermatologists for cases of suspected cellulitis has been shown to reduce misdiagnosis rates and improve patient outcomes.

Associated musculoskeletal findings are sometimes reported. When it occurs with acne conglobata, hidradenitis suppurativa, and pilonidal cysts, the syndrome is referred to as the follicular occlusion triad or tetrad.

Lyme disease can be misdiagnosed as cellulitis. The characteristic bullseye rash does not always appear in Lyme disease (the rash may not have a central or ring-like clearing, or not appear at all). Factors supportive of Lyme include recent outdoor activities where Lyme is common and rash at an unusual site for cellulitis, such as armpit, groin, or behind the knee. Lyme can also result in long-term neurologic complications. The standard treatment for cellulitis, cephalexin, is not useful in Lyme disease. When it is unclear which one is present, the IDSA recommends treatment with cefuroxime axetil or amoxicillin/clavulanic acid, as these are effective against both infections.

== Prevention ==
In those who have previously had cellulitis, antibiotic use may help prevent future episodes. This is recommended by Clinical Resource Efficiency Support Team (CREST) for those who have had more than two episodes. A 2017 meta-analysis found a benefit of preventative antibiotics for recurrent cellulitis in the lower limbs, but the preventative effects appear to diminish after stopping antibiotic therapy.

== Treatment ==
Antibiotics are usually prescribed, with the agent selected based on suspected organism and presence or absence of purulence, although the best treatment choice is unclear. If an abscess is also present, surgical drainage is usually indicated, with antibiotics often prescribed for co-existent cellulitis, especially if extensive. Pain relief is also often prescribed, but excessive pain should always be investigated, as it is a symptom of necrotizing fasciitis. Elevation of the affected area is often recommended.

Steroids may speed recovery in those on antibiotics.

=== Antibiotics ===
Antibiotic choices depend on regional availability, but a penicillinase-resistant semisynthetic penicillin or a first-generation cephalosporin is currently recommended for cellulitis without abscess. A course of antibiotics is not effective in between 6 and 37% of cases.

== Epidemiology ==
Cellulitis in 2016 resulted in about 16,900 deaths worldwide, up from 12,600 in 2005.

Cellulitis is a common global health burden, with more than 650,000 admissions per year in the United States alone. In the United States, an estimated 14.5 million cases annually of cellulitis account for $3.7 billion in ambulatory care costs alone. The majority of cases of cellulitis are nonculturable, and therefore, the causative bacteria are unknown. In the 15% of cellulitis cases in which organisms are identified, most are due to β-hemolytic Streptococcus and Staphylococcus aureus.

== Other animals ==
Horses may acquire cellulitis, usually secondarily to a wound (which can be extremely small and superficial) or to a deep-tissue infection, such as an abscess or infected bone, tendon sheath, or joint. Cellulitis from a superficial wound usually creates less lameness (grade 1–2 of 5) than that caused by septic arthritis (grade 4–5). The horse exhibits inflammatory edema, which is a hot, painful swelling. This swelling differs from stocking up in that the horse does not display symmetrical swelling in two or four legs, but in only one leg. This swelling begins near the source of infection, but eventually continues down the leg. In some cases, the swelling also travels distally. Treatment includes cleaning the wound and caring for it properly, the administration of NSAIDs, such as phenylbutazone, cold hosing, applying a sweat wrap or a poultice, and mild exercise.

== See also ==
- Haemophilus influenzae cellulitis
- Helicobacter cellulitis
- Tuberculous cellulitis
