= Discovery of penicillin =

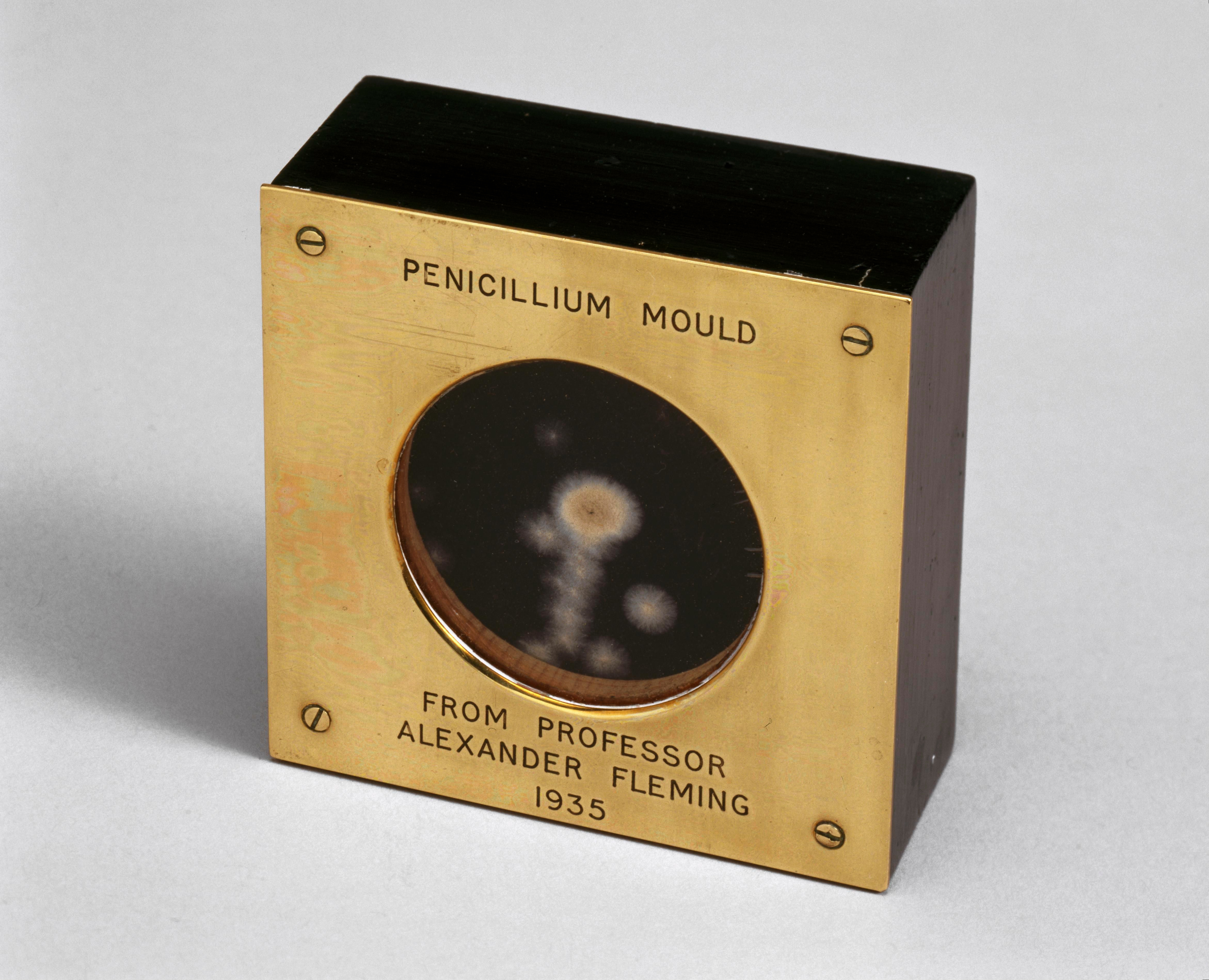
Sample of penicillin mould presented by Alexander Fleming to Douglas Macleod in 1935

The discovery of penicillin was one of the most important scientific discoveries in the history of medicine. Ancient societies used moulds to treat infections and in the following centuries many people observed the inhibition of bacterial growth by moulds. While working at St Mary's Hospital in London in 1928, Scottish physician Alexander Fleming was the first to experimentally demonstrate that a Penicillium mould secretes an antibacterial substance, which he named "penicillin". The mould was found to be a variant of Penicillium notatum (now called Penicillium rubens), a contaminant of a bacterial culture in his laboratory. The work on penicillin at St Mary's ended in 1929.

In 1939, a team of scientists at the Sir William Dunn School of Pathology at the University of Oxford, led by Howard Florey that included Edward Abraham, Ernst Chain, Jean Orr-Ewing, Arthur Gardner, Norman Heatley and Margaret Jennings, began researching penicillin. They devised a method for cultivating the mould, as well as extracting, purifying and storing penicillin from it. They created an assay for measuring its purity. They carried out experiments with animals to determine penicillin's safety and effectiveness before conducting clinical trials and field tests. They derived its chemical formula and determined how it works. The private sector and the United States Department of Agriculture located and produced new strains and developed mass production techniques. Penicillin became an important part of the Allied war effort in the Second World War, saving the lives of thousands of soldiers. Fleming, Florey and Chain shared the 1945 Nobel Prize in Physiology or Medicine for its discovery and development.

== Background ==
Many ancient cultures, including those in Australia, China, Egypt, Greece and India, independently discovered the useful properties of fungi and plants in treating infection. These treatments often worked because many organisms, including many species of mould, naturally produce antibiotic substances. However, ancient practitioners could not precisely identify or isolate the active components in these organisms.

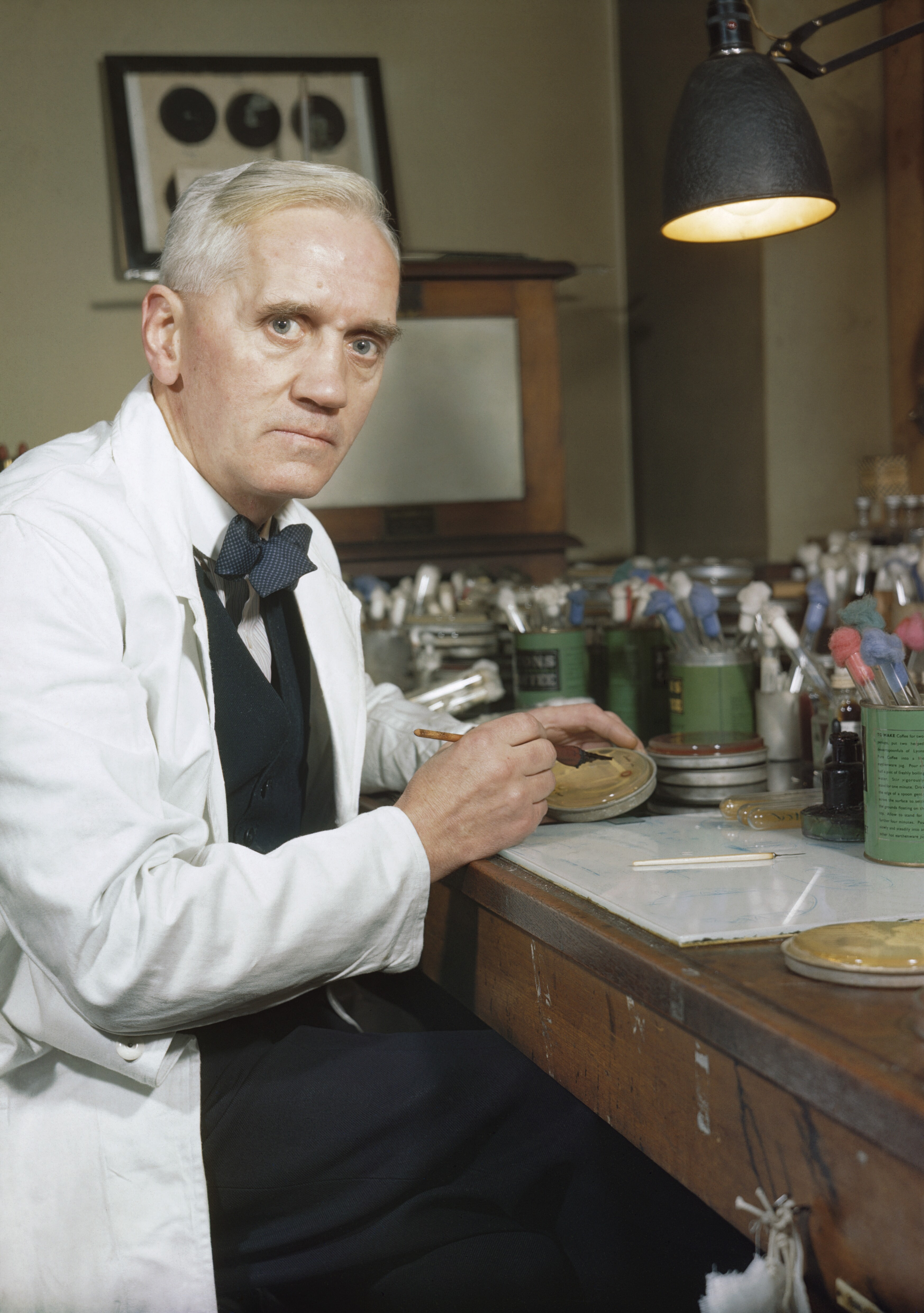
Alexander Fleming in his laboratory at St Mary's Hospital, London, 1943

While working at St Mary's Hospital, London, in 1928, a Scottish physician, Alexander Fleming, was investigating the pattern of variation in S. aureus. He was inspired by the discovery of an Irish physician, Joseph Warwick Bigger, and his two students, C.R. Boland and R.A.Q. O’Meara, at Trinity College, Dublin, in 1927. Bigger and his students found that when they cultured a particular strain of S. aureus, which they had designated "Y" and isolated a year earlier from the pus of a patient's axillary abscess, the bacterium grew into a variety of strains. They published their discovery as "Variant colonies of Staphylococcus aureus" in The Journal of Pathology and Bacteriology, concluding:

We were surprised and rather disturbed to find, on a number of plates, various types of colonies which differed completely from the typical aureus colony. Some of these were quite white; some, either white or of the usual colour were rough on the surface and with crenated margins.

Fleming and his research scholar Daniel Merlin Pryce pursued this experiment but Pryce was transferred to another laboratory in early 1928. After a few months of working alone, a new scholar, Stuart Craddock, joined Fleming. Their experiment was successful and Fleming was planning and agreed to write a report in A System of Bacteriology to be published by the Medical Research Council (MRC) by the end of 1928. In August, Fleming spent the summer break with his family at his country home The Dhoon at Barton Mills, Suffolk. Before leaving his laboratory, he inoculated several culture plates with S. aureus. He kept the plates aside on one corner of the table away from direct sunlight and to make space for Craddock to work in his absence. While on holiday, he was appointed Professor of Bacteriology at the St Mary's Hospital Medical School on 1 September 1928. He arrived at his laboratory on 3 September, where Pryce was waiting to greet him. As he and Pryce examined the culture plates, they found one with an open lid and the culture contaminated with a blue-green mould. In the contaminated plate the bacteria around the mould did not grow, while those farther away grew normally, meaning that the mould killed the bacteria. Fleming commented as he watched the plate: "That's funny". Pryce remarked to Fleming: "That's how you discovered lysozyme." Fleming photographed the culture and took a sample of the mould for identification before preserving the culture with formaldehyde.

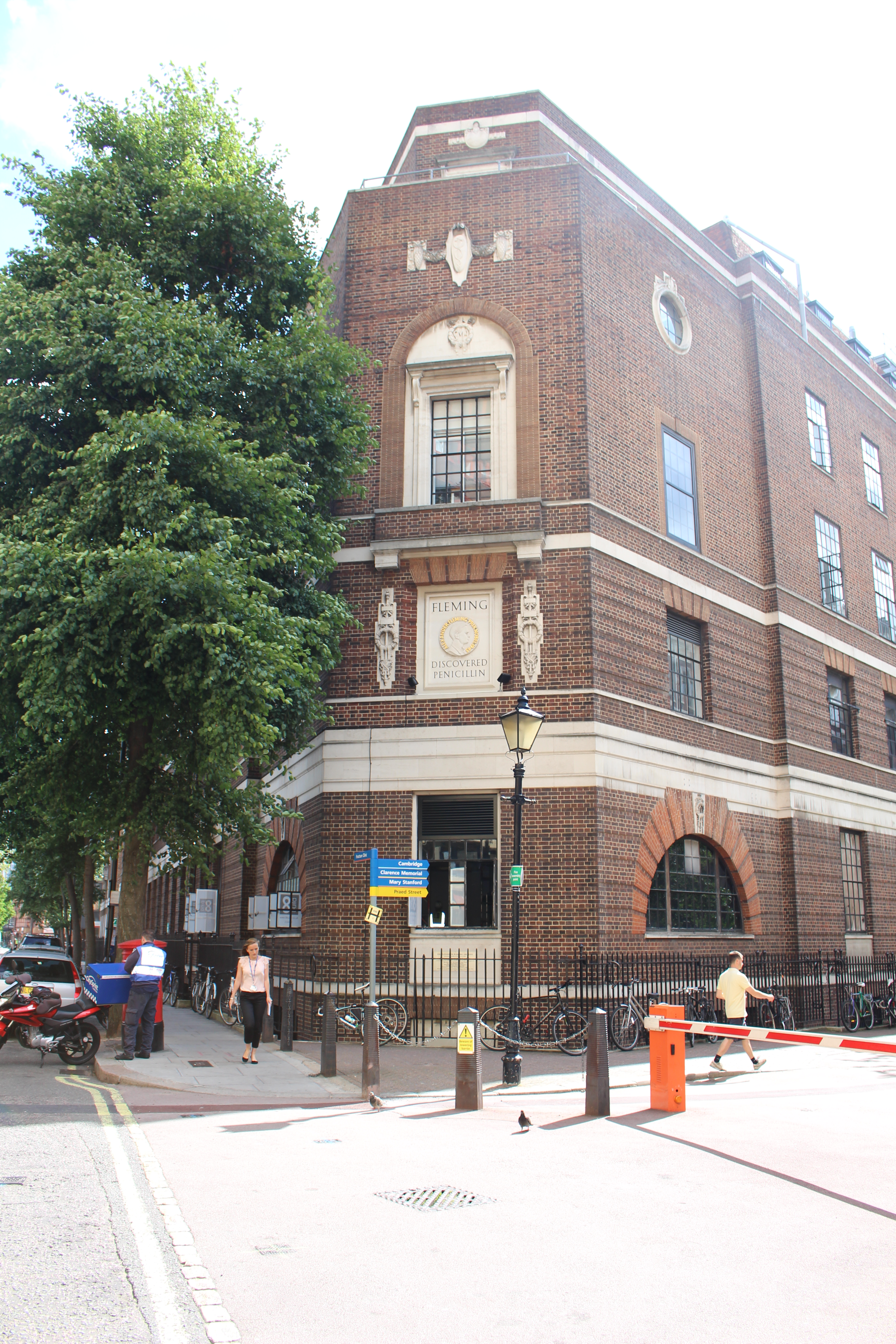
St Mary's Hospital showing Fleming's lab and Praed Street

Fleming resumed his vacation and returned in September. According to his notes on 30 October, he collected the original mould and grew it in culture plates. After four days he found that the plates developed large colonies of the mould. He repeated the experiment with the same bacteria-killing results. He later recounted his experience:

When I woke up just after dawn on September 28, 1928, I certainly didn't plan to revolutionize all medicine by discovering the world's first antibiotic, or bacteria killer. But I suppose that was exactly what I did.

He concluded that the mould was releasing a substance that was inhibiting bacterial growth, and he produced culture broth of the mould and subsequently concentrated the antibacterial component. After testing against different bacteria, he found that the mould could kill only specific, Gram-positive bacteria. For example, staphylococcus, streptococcus, and diphtheria bacillus (Corynebacterium diphtheriae) were easily killed; but there was no effect on typhoid bacterium (Salmonella typhimurium) and a bacterium once thought to cause influenza (Haemophilus influenzae). He prepared a large-culture method from which he could obtain large amounts of the mould juice. He called this juice "penicillin", explaining the reason as "to avoid the repetition of the rather cumbersome phrase 'Mould broth filtrate'." He invented the name on 7 March 1929. In his Nobel lecture he gave a further explanation, saying:

I have been frequently asked why I invented the name "Penicillin". I simply followed perfectly orthodox lines and coined a word which explained that the substance penicillin was derived from a plant of the genus Penicillium just as many years ago the word "Digitalin" was invented for a substance derived from the plant Digitalis.

For the effect on the cultures of staphylococci that Fleming observed, the mould had to be growing before the bacteria began to grow, because penicillin is only effective on bacteria when they are reproducing. Fortuitously, the temperature in the laboratory during that August was optimal first for the growth of the mould, below 20 °C (68 °F), and later in the month for the bacteria, when it reached 25 °C (77 °F). Had Fleming not left the cultures on his laboratory bench and put them in an incubator, the phenomenon would not have occurred.

Fleming had no training in chemistry; he left all the chemical work to Craddock, once remarking "I am a bacteriologist, not a chemist." In January 1929, he recruited Frederick Ridley, his former research scholar who had studied biochemistry, specifically to study the chemical properties of the mould. But they could not isolate penicillin, and before the experiments were over, Craddock and Ridley both left Fleming for other jobs. It was due to his failure to isolate the compound that Fleming practically abandoned further research on the chemical aspects of penicillin.

== Identification of the mould ==
After structural comparison with different species of Penicillium, Fleming initially believed that his specimen was Penicillium chrysogenum, a species described by an American microbiologist Charles Thom in 1910. He was fortunate that Charles John Patrick La Touche, an Irish botanist, had just recently joined St Mary's as a mycologist to investigate fungi as the cause of asthma. La Touche identified the specimen as Penicillium rubrum, the identification used by Fleming in his publication.

In 1931, Thom re-examined different Penicillium including that of Fleming's specimen. He came to a confusing conclusion, stating, "Ad. 35 [Fleming's specimen] is P. notatum WESTLING. This is a member of the P. chrysogenum series with smaller conidia than P. chrysogenum itself." From then on, Fleming's mould was synonymously referred to as P. notatum and P. chrysogenum. But Thom adopted and popularised the use of P. chrysogenum. In addition to P. notatum, newly discovered species such as P. meleagrinum and P. cyaneofulvum were recognised as members of P. chrysogenum in 1977. To resolve the confusion, the Seventeenth International Botanical Congress held in Vienna, Austria, in 2005 formally adopted the name P. chrysogenum as the conserved name (nomen conservandum). Whole genome sequence and phylogenetic analysis in 2011 revealed that Fleming's mould belongs to P. rubens, a species described by Belgian microbiologist Philibert Biourge in 1923.

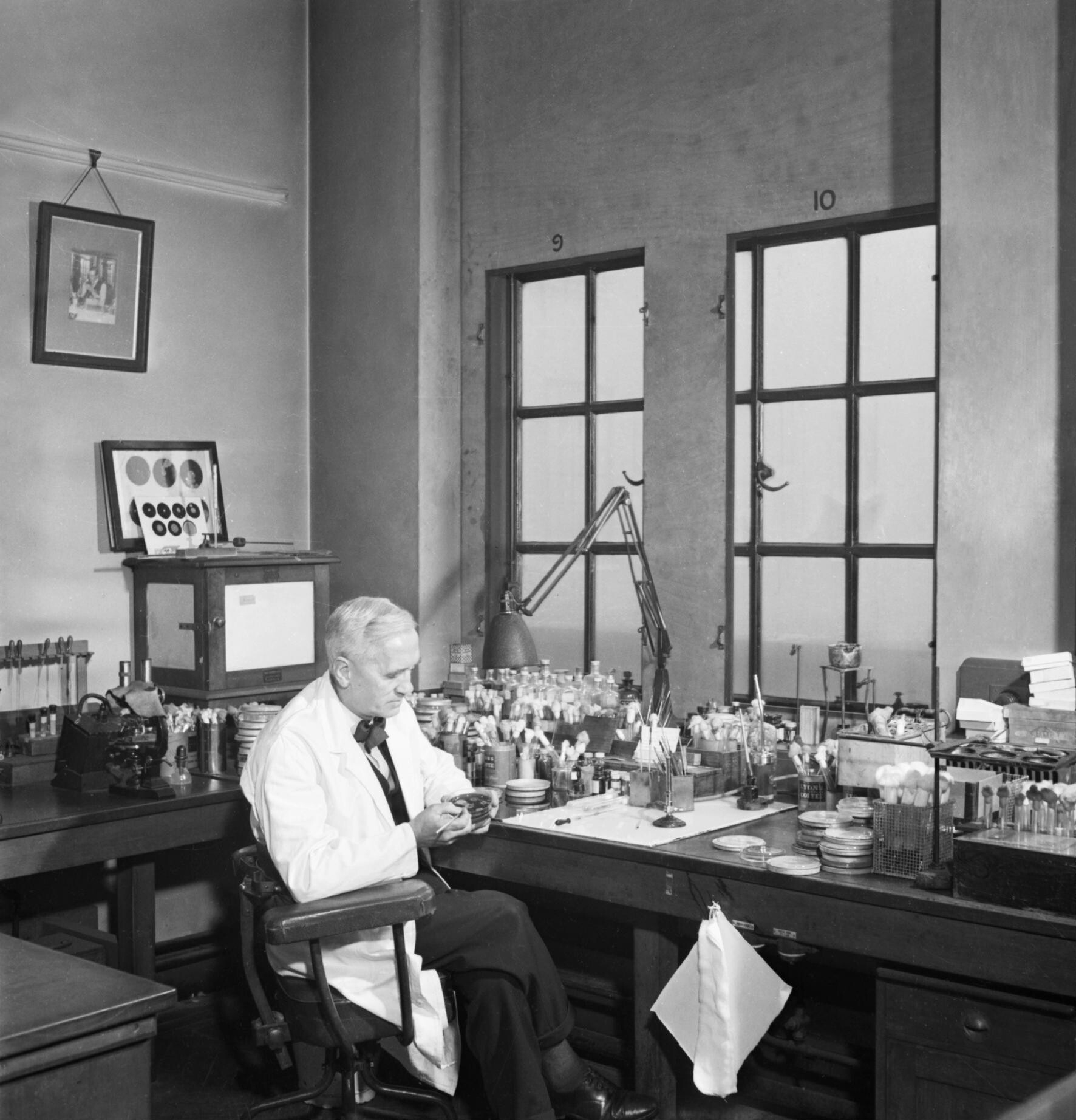
Fleming at work in his laboratory at St Mary's Hospital, London, during the Second World War

The source of the fungal contamination in Fleming's experiment remained a speculation for several decades. Fleming suggested in 1945 that the fungal spores came through the window facing Praed Street. This story was regarded as a fact and was popularised in literature, starting with George Lacken's 1945 book The Story of Penicillin. But it was later disputed by his co-workers including Pryce, who testified much later that Fleming's laboratory window was kept shut all the time. Ronald Hare also agreed in 1970 that the window was most often locked because it was difficult to reach due to a large table with apparatuses placed in front of it. In 1966, La Touche told Hare that he had given Fleming thirteen specimens of fungi (ten from his lab) and only one from his lab was showing penicillin-like antibacterial activity. After this, a consensus developed that Fleming's mould had come from La Touche's lab, a floor below Fleming's, as spores which had drifted in through the open doors.

Craddock developed severe infection of the nasal antrum (sinusitis) and had undergone surgery. Fleming made use of the surgical opening of the nasal passage and started injecting penicillin on 9 January 1929 but without any effect, probably because the infection was with H. influenzae, a bacterium unsusceptible to penicillin. Fleming gave some of his original penicillin samples to his colleague, surgeon Arthur Dickson Wright for clinical testing in 1928. Although Wright reportedly said that it "seemed to work satisfactorily," there are no records of its use. In 1930 and 1931, Cecil George Paine, a pathologist at the Royal Infirmary in Sheffield, was the first to successfully use penicillin for medical treatment. He attempted to treat sycosis (eruptions in beard follicles) with penicillin but was unsuccessful, probably because the drug did not penetrate deep enough into the skin. He cured three babies with ophthalmia neonatorum, an eye infection, and a local coal miner whose eye had become infected after an accident, but he did not publish his work.

== Reception and publication ==
Fleming's discovery was initially regarded as unimportant. Even as he showed his culture plates to his colleagues, all he received was an indifferent response. He described the discovery on 13 February 1929 before the Medical Research Club. His presentation, titled "A medium for the isolation of Pfeiffer's bacillus", did not receive any particular attention.

In 1929, Fleming reported his findings to the British Journal of Experimental Pathology on 10 May 1929, and published them in the next month's issue. His article failed to attract any serious attention. Fleming himself was quite unsure of the medical application of his work and was more concerned with its application for bacterial isolation, as he concluded:

In addition to its possible use in the treatment of bacterial infections, penicillin is certainly useful to the bacteriologist for its power of inhibiting unwanted microbes in bacterial cultures so that penicillin-insensitive bacteria can readily be isolated. A notable instance of this is the very easy isolation of Pfeiffer's bacillus of influenza when penicillin is used ... It is suggested that it may be an efficient antiseptic for application to, or injection into, areas infected with penicillin-sensitive microbes.

G. E. Breen, a fellow member of the Chelsea Arts Club, once asked Fleming if he thought it would ever be possible to make practical use of penicillin. Fleming gazed vacantly for a moment and then replied, "I don't know. It's too unstable. It will have to be purified, and I can't do that by myself." In 1941, the British Medical Journal reported that

The original colony of this mould, which proved to be Penicillium notatum, inhibited the growth of staphylococci in its vicinity, and fluid cultures of it contained a substance, since known as "penicillin", which was strongly inhibitory to the growth of various mainly Gram-positive bacteria. It came to be used at St. Mary's Hospital and elsewhere as an ingredient in selective culture media, and does not appear to have been considered as possibly useful from any other point of view.

Although Ridley and Craddock had demonstrated that penicillin was soluble in ether, acetone and alcohol as well as in water – information that would be critical to its isolation – Fleming erroneously claimed that it was soluble in alcohol and insoluble in ether and chloroform, which had not been tested. In fact, penicillin is soluble in ethanol, ether and chloroform.

== Replication ==
In 1944, Margaret Jennings determined how penicillin acts, and showed that it has no lytic effects on mature organisms, including staphylococci; lysis occurs only if penicillin acts on bacteria during their initial stages of division and growth, when it interferes with the metabolic process that forms the cell wall. This brought Fleming's explanation into question, for the mould had to have been there before the staphylococci. Over the next twenty years, all attempts to replicate Fleming's results failed. In 1964, Ronald Hare took up the challenge. Like those before him, he found he could not get the mould to grow properly on a plate containing staphylococci colonies. He re-examined Fleming's paper and images of the original Petri dish. He attempted to replicate the original layout of the dish so there was a large space between the staphylococci. He was then able to get the mould to grow, but it had no effect on the bacteria.

Finally, on 1 August 1966, Hare was able to duplicate Fleming's results. However, when he tried again a fortnight later, the experiment failed. He considered whether the weather had anything to do with it, for Penicillium grows well in cold temperatures, but staphylococci do not. He conducted a series of experiments with the temperature carefully controlled, and found that penicillin would be reliably "rediscovered" when the temperature was below 20 °C (68 °F), but never when it was above 32 °C (90 °F). He consulted the weather records for 1928, and found that, as in 1966, there was a heat wave in mid-August followed by nine days of cold weather starting on 28 August that greatly favoured the growth of the mould.

== Nobel Prize ==
In 1939, ten years after work ceased at St. Mary's, a team of scientists at the Sir William Dunn School of Pathology at the University of Oxford, led by Howard Florey that included Edward Abraham, Ernst Chain, Norman Heatley and Margaret Jennings, began researching penicillin. Their starting point was Fleming's largely forgotten paper and a sample of penicillin mould Fleming had given to their laboratory in 1930. They developed a method for cultivating the mould and extracting, purifying and storing penicillin from it, together with an assay for measuring its purity. Chain hit upon the idea of freeze drying it, which enabled the water to be removed, resulting in a dry, brown powder. They carried out experiments with animals to determine penicillin's safety and effectiveness before conducting clinical trials and field tests. They derived its chemical structure and determined how it works. The private sector and the United States Department of Agriculture located and produced new strains and developed mass production techniques. During the Second World War penicillin became an important part of the Allied war effort, and is credited with saving the lives of thousands of soldiers.

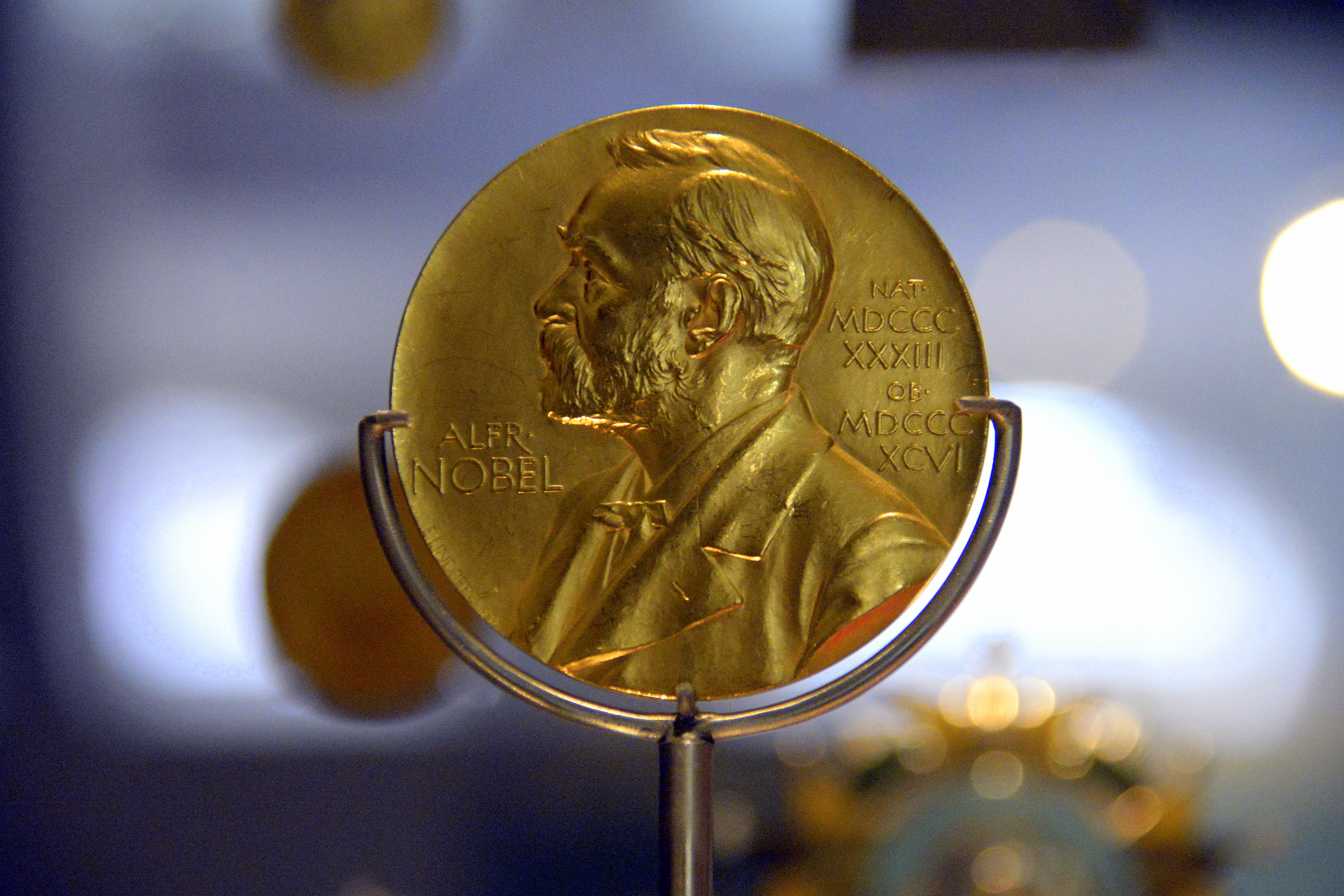
Nobel Prize in Physiology or Medicine medal awarded to Sir Alexander Fleming, on display at the National Museum of Scotland

When the news of the curative properties of penicillin broke, Fleming revelled in the publicity. Journalists told a familiar story of a lone British scientist and a serendipitous discovery. The British medical historian Bill Bynum wrote:

The discovery and development of penicillin is an object lesson of modernity: the contrast between an alert individual (Fleming) making an isolated observation and the exploitation of the observation through teamwork and the scientific division of labour (Florey and his group). The discovery was old science, but the drug itself required new ways of doing science.

In 1943, the Nobel committee received a single nomination for the Nobel Prize in Physiology or Medicine for Fleming and Florey from the British biochemist Rudolph Peters. The secretary of the Nobel committee, Göran Liljestrand, made an assessment of Fleming and Florey in the same year, but little was known about penicillin in Sweden at the time, and he concluded that more information was required. The following year, there was one nomination for Fleming alone and one for Fleming, Florey and Chain. Liljestrand and Nanna Svartz considered their work, and while both judged Fleming and Florey equally worthy of a Nobel Prize, the Nobel committee was divided, and decided to award the prize that year to Joseph Erlanger and Herbert S. Gasser instead.

In 1945 there were a large number of nominations for Florey and Fleming or both, and one for Chain, from Liljestrand, who nominated all three. Liljestrand noted that thirteen of the first sixteen nominations that came in mentioned Fleming, but only three mentioned him alone. This time evaluations were made by Liljestrand, Sven Hellerström and Anders Kristenson, who endorsed all three. The Nobel Assembly at the Karolinska Institute considered awarding half to Fleming and one-quarter each to Florey and Chain, but in the end decided to divide it equally three ways. On 25 October 1945, it announced that Fleming, Florey and Chain equally shared the 1945 Nobel Prize in Physiology or Medicine "for the discovery of penicillin and its curative effect in various infectious diseases."
