= Margaret Jennings =

Margaret Jennings may refer to:

- Margaret Jennings (cricketer) (born 1949), Australian cricketer
- Margaret Jennings (scientist) (1904–1994), British scientist
- Margaret Jennings (racing driver) (née Allan; 1909–1998), Scottish racing driver and journalist
- Margaret Jennings, possible victim of Black Widows of Liverpool
