= Albert Alexander (police officer) =

British police officer, first human treated with penicillin

Reserve Constable Albert Alexander (1896 – 15 March 1941) was the first patient to be treated with injections of penicillin.

Albert Alexander was a constable in the police force of the County of Oxford, England. A bombing raid is likely the cause of the injuries sustained by Constable Alexander that was to become the source of his bacterial infection, rather than what became the prevailing narrative, a scratch by a rose thorn on his face. Alexander became badly infected with both Staphylococcus and Streptococcus and was hospitalised in the Radcliffe Infirmary. Despite efforts of various treatments, Alexander's head was covered with abscesses and one of his eyes had been removed.

Dr Ethel Florey, lab partner and wife of pharmacologist and medic Dr Howard Walter Florey, and Dr Charles Fletcher brought Constable Alexander's case to Florey's attention.

The ability of penicillin to slow or counteract bacterial infection had first been noticed by Sir Alexander Fleming in 1928. Florey, Ernst Boris Chain and Norman Heatley, at the Sir William Dunn School of Pathology, University of Oxford were working on the medical applications of penicillin, as produced by the mould Penicillium notatum, and attempting to isolate quantities of penicillin from the mould large enough for a human trial.

Having tried the extracted penicillin only on mice, Florey and colleagues were fearful of the side effects large doses of penicillin might have. For a human volunteer, they needed a patient who was in a terminal condition; Constable Alexander suited this requirement.

On 12 February 1941, Constable Alexander was given an intravenous infusion of 160 mg (200 units) of penicillin. Within 24 hours, Alexander's temperature had dropped, his appetite had returned and the infection had begun to heal. However, due to the instability of penicillin and the war-time restrictions placed on Howard Florey's Laboratory, only a small quantity of penicillin had been extracted and, although Florey and colleagues extracted any remaining penicillin from Alexander's urine, by the fifth day they had run out.

Without the supply of penicillin to continue treatment, Constable Alexander relapsed and died on 15 March 1941.

Florey and his team decided to work only on sick children who did not need such large amounts of penicillin, until their methods of production improved. This was not a trivial challenge: penicillin production varied widely depending on the conditions in which it was grown. During World War II, several American companies tried to scale up production. In the words of Pfizer executive John Smith, "The mold is as temperamental as an opera singer, the yields are low, the isolation murder, the purification invites disaster." Nonetheless, by March 15, 1945, supplies of penicillin were not only available to American troops, but to the American public, as war-time restrictions on availability were lifted.
