= Joan Gardner (microbiologist) =

Australian microbiologist (1918–2013)

Joan Gardner

Joan Forrest Gardner AO (16 June 1918 – 19 November 2013) was an Australian microbiologist who had an extensive career researching and teaching in the areas of disinfection, infection control, and sterilisation.

== Early life and education ==
Gardner was born in 1918 into a distinguished medical and scientific family. Her uncle was Nobel laureate Howard Florey; her mother, Hilda Josephine Gardner, was a leading bacteriologist, serologist and hematologist in Melbourne; and her father, Jack Gardner, was a physician and army medical officer during World War I.

Gardner attended Tintern Grammar from 1929-1936, then studied at the University of Melbourne from which she graduated with a Bachelor of Science (BSc) and Master of Science (MSc) in microbiology. Following her graduation, she travelled to England to attend the Sir William Dunn School of Pathology at the University of Oxford where she gained her doctorate (DPhil [Oxon]). It was in England that she became interested in the sterilisation of medical equipment, as important advances in the field were being made there.

== Career ==
Gardner returned to Australia, where she was appointed as a lecturer (later senior lecturer) at the University of Melbourne's Department of Bacteriology. In addition to conducting research in the infection control field, Gardner organized and conducted a series of advanced training courses for infection control nurses and hospital sterilisation staff.

She was a member of several committees for Standards Australia where she developed and contributed to the standards of sterilisers and other related hospital equipment.

== Awards and honours ==
Gardner was appointed as an Officer of the Order of Australia in the 1992 Queen's Birthday Honours in recognition of service to medicine in the field of sterilisation, disinfection and infection control.

== Bibliography ==
- Review of sterilization and disinfection (1965; with Sydney Dattilo Rubbo)
- Sterilization, disinfection and infection control (first edition 1986, second edition 1991, third edition 1998; with Margaret M. Peel)
