= Howard Florey =

Australian pathologist (1898–1968)

The Right Honourable The Lord Florey OM FRS FRCP
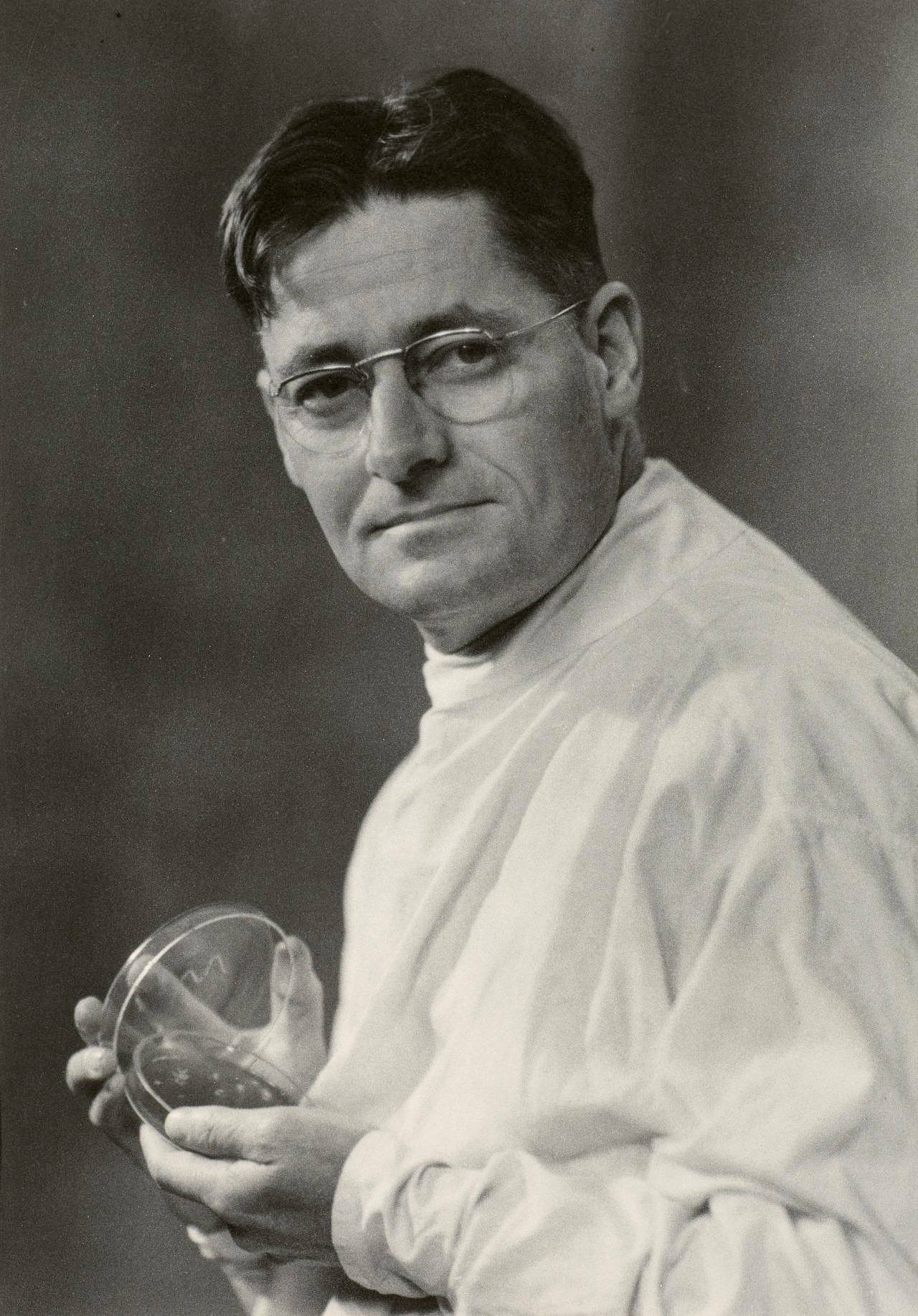
- 1930s portrait
- Born: Howard Walter Florey; 24 September 1898; Adelaide, Australia
- Died: 21 February 1968 (aged 69); Oxford, England
- Education: University of Adelaide; Magdalen College, Oxford; Gonville and Caius College, Cambridge
- Known for: Discovery of penicillin
- Spouses: Mary Ethel Florey (m. 1926; died 1966); Margaret Jennings (m. 1967)
- Children: 2, including Charles du Vé
- Relatives: Hilda Gardner (sister); Joan Gardner (niece)
- Awards: See list: Knight Bachelor (1944); Cameron Prize for Therapeutics of the University of Edinburgh (1945); Nobel Prize in Physiology or Medicine (1945); Lister Medal (1945); Royal Medal (1951); Copley Medal (1957); Order of Merit (1965)
- Scientific career
- Fields: Bacteriology; immunology
- Workplaces: University of Adelaide; University of Oxford; University of Cambridge; University of Sheffield; Australian National University

Howard Walter Florey, Baron Florey (/ˈflɔːri/; 24 September 1898 – 21 February 1968) was an Australian pharmacologist and pathologist who shared the Nobel Prize in Physiology or Medicine in 1945 with Ernst Chain and Sir Alexander Fleming "for the discovery of penicillin and its curative effect in various infectious diseases".

Although Fleming received most of the credit for the discovery of penicillin, it was Florey and his team at the University of Oxford who made it into a useful and effective drug, ten years after Fleming had abandoned its development. They developed techniques for growing, purifying and manufacturing the drug, tested it for toxicity and efficacy on animals, and carried out the first clinical trials. In 1941, they used it to treat a police constable from Oxford. He started to recover, but subsequently died because Florey was unable, at that time, to make enough penicillin. Later trials in Britain, the United States and North Africa were highly successful.

A graduate of the University of Adelaide, Florey studied at the University of Oxford as a Rhodes Scholar and in the United States on a fellowship from the Rockefeller Foundation. In 1935, he became the director of the Sir William Dunn School of Pathology at Oxford. He assembled a multidisciplinary staff that could tackle major research projects. In addition to his work on penicillin, he researched many other subjects, most notably lysozyme, contraception and cephalosporins. He was involved in the founding of the Australian National University in Canberra and the establishment of its John Curtin School of Medical Research, and he served as chancellor of the Australian National University from 1965 until his death in 1968. He was elected a fellow of the Royal Society in 1941, and as its president from 1960 to 1965, he oversaw its move to new accommodations at Carlton House Terrace and the establishment of links with European organisations. In 1962, he became provost of The Queen's College, Oxford.

Florey's discoveries are estimated to have saved over 80 million lives, and he is regarded by the Australian scientific and medical community as one of its greatest figures. Australian prime minister Sir Robert Menzies said, "In terms of world well-being, Florey was the most important man ever born in Australia."

== Early life and education ==
Howard Walter Florey was born in Malvern, a southern suburb of Adelaide, South Australia, on 24 September 1898. His surname rhymes with "sorry". He was the only son of Joseph Florey, a bootmaker from Oxfordshire in England, who as a boy moved to London where Florey's grandfather established a bootmaking business. Joseph Florey's first wife was Charlotte Ames, with whom he had two daughters, Charlotte, who was born in 1880, and Anne, who was born in 1882. After his wife contracted pulmonary tuberculosis, the family emigrated to South Australia, where it was hoped that the climate would be more congenial. Her health gradually declined and she died in April 1886. Joseph Florey established his own bootmaking business in Adelaide, and married Bertha Mary Waldham, the daughter of his housekeeper. Their first child together, Hilda, was born on 6 September 1890. She became a bacteriologist and a pioneer of laboratory medicine. A second daughter, Valetta, was born in 1891. Thus, Florey had two older sisters and two older half-sisters.

In 1906, the family moved to "Coreega", a mansion in the Adelaide suburb of Mitcham. Florey attended Unley Park School, a local private school, taking the two-mile (3.2 km) trip to school each day in a horse-drawn tram with Mollie Clampett, a friend who lived in the rectory adjacent to Coreega. At school he acquired the lifelong nickname "Floss", this being, like "Florrie", a common diminutive form of "Florence". He transferred to Kyre College, a private boys' school, in 1908. In 1911, he entered St Peter's College, Adelaide, where he excelled in chemistry, physics, mathematics and history. He played various sports for the school: cricket, Australian football, tennis, and track and field athletics as a sprinter and high jumper. The cost of his education was covered by four scholarships. He served in the Senior Cadets, in which he was commissioned as a second lieutenant in August 1916. After the First World War broke out in 1914, he wished to enlist, but parental permission was required and was not forthcoming. He was head boy in his final year at school, and was ranked twelfth in the state in his final examinations.

Rather than become a businessman like his father, Florey elected to follow in the footsteps of his sister Hilda, who studied medicine. He entered the University of Adelaide in March 1917, his fees paid entirely by a state scholarship. This allowed him to continue his studies after his father died from a heart attack on 15 September 1918, and the shoe company was found to be insolvent and went into liquidation. Coreega and other properties had to be sold, and in 1920, the family moved into a bungalow in Glen Osmond. Florey participated in university athletics and tennis. He was an editor of the Medical Students' Society's Review and the Adelaide University Magazine. It was through the latter that he met Mary Ethel Hayter Reed, a fellow medical student, when he asked her to contribute an article on Women in Medicine.

== Rhodes Scholar ==
Florey decided to pursue medical research, a speciality that required study overseas. In August 1920, he applied for a Rhodes Scholarship to pursue his studies at the University of Oxford in England. His selection as the successful candidate for South Australia was announced on 8 December. This was a high honour, and came with a stipend of £300 (equivalent to $47,000 in 2022). The Rhodes Committee wanted him to commence in October, the start of the academic year at Oxford. This meant either postponing his scholarship for a year or deferring his final qualifying examinations for his medical degrees until he returned. Florey insisted that he would do neither; he would take his examinations and start at Oxford at the commencement of the Hilary term in January 1922. With the aid of the Governor of South Australia, Sir Archibald Weigall, Florey won the argument. He passed his examinations with second-class honours, and he was awarded his Bachelor of Medicine, Bachelor of Surgery degree in absentia in December 1921. During the summer break he went to Broken Hill Hospital, where he worked as a clinical assistant.

On 11 December 1921, Florey embarked for England from Port Adelaide on the SS Otira, an ocean liner of the Shaw, Savill & Albion Line, travelling for free as the ship's surgeon. The ship reached Hull on 24 January 1922, and Florey took a train to London, where his sister Anne met him at King's Cross Station. Two days later he left for Oxford, where he met with the Secretary of the Rhodes Trust, Francis James Wylie. He had to choose a college, and he chose to study at Magdalen College, Oxford, where his high school headmaster, Henry Girdlestone, had gone. He enrolled in the honour school of physiology, where he studied under the tutelage of Sir Charles Scott Sherrington. During the summer breaks he visited France, Belgium, Germany, Italy, Czechoslovakia and Austria. He became a demonstrator in the physiology department, and he applied for a fellowship in physiology at Merton College, but was passed over in favour of Gavin de Beer. He was awarded the degree of Bachelor of Arts in 1924. At Sherrington's instigation, he studied the cerebral cortex of cats. A paper was published in Brain in March 1925. His thesis on "The capillary circulation together with associated observations made in connexion with this investigation" was later examined by John Scott Haldane and John Gillies Priestley on 2 May 1925, and he was awarded a Bachelor of Science degree.

Florey was elected to a John Lucas Walker Studentship at the University of Cambridge for the 1924–1925 academic year. This came with a stipend of £300 plus £200 for equipment. Before taking up this new position, he participated in the 1924 Oxford University Arctic Expedition as the medical officer. In July 1925, he won a fellowship from the Rockefeller Foundation to study in the United States. He sailed for New York on the RMS Caronia on 19 September 1925, intending to study under Robert Chambers at Cornell University Medical College, but the micromanipulator he required for his research on the blood vessels of the brain was not available, so he arranged to work at the laboratory of Alfred Newton Richards at the University of Pennsylvania. He finally joined Chambers in March 1926. He hoped to be able to return to the UK via Australia and marry Ethel Reed in Adelaide, but in November 1925 he accepted an offer of a research position at London Hospital. The position came with five years' tenure and a salary of £850 per annum (equivalent to £45,000 in 2025), but they wanted him to start immediately. Florey managed to negotiate a delay, but only until May 1926. He returned to the UK on 13 May. Ethel joined him there in September, and they were married at Holy Trinity, Paddington, on 19 October.

== Early career ==
=== London Hospital ===
Florey was unhappy working at London Hospital; he disliked the long daily commute from Chobham that put his experimental work at the mercy of the railway timetable. In the summer Howard and Ethel lived in a flat in Belsize Park so he could devote more time to his work. He wrote up the results of the research he had done in New York on lacteals and lymphatic capillaries, which was published in the Journal of Physiology in 1927.

Florey then embarked on writing a thesis for a fellowship at Gonville and Caius College, Cambridge, where he became an unofficial fellow in 1926. His thesis on "Physiology and pathology of the circulation of the blood and lymph" was accepted, and his fellowship awarded in 1927. He also continued his work on the secretion of mucus. London Hospital's facilities for the laboratory animals he needed for his research were unsatisfactory, so these experiments were carried out at Oxford and Cambridge. However, he was able to study the lacteals in patients undergoing abdominal surgery.

=== University of Cambridge ===
The sudden death of British pathologist Thomas Strangeways on 23 December 1926 created a vacancy in the Huddersfield Lectureship in Special Pathology at Cambridge, and it was offered to Florey. At Cambridge, Florey had a secure appointment and fine laboratory facilities, although the salary of £900 (equivalent to £48,000 in 2025) was only slightly higher. He had to teach, which he disliked, preferring research, but there was satisfaction that the new tripos course was largely designed by himself and Alan Nigel Drury. He recruited fourteen-year-old Jim Kent as his assistant. It was the practice at Cambridge that laboratory technicians would rotate through the various laboratory departments, which provided them with thorough training, but was frustrating to the researcher, who had to break in a new assistant every few months. Finding a good one was difficult for Florey; his reputation for hard work, long hours and exacting standards preceded him. He arranged for Kent to be permanently assigned as his assistant, and Kent would remain in the role for the next forty years.

The Floreys bought a house in Cambridge, and Florey cycled to work every day, including Sundays, arriving at 10:00, except on class days when he had to be there earlier. Ethel collaborated on two papers, co-written with Drury and Albert Szent-Györgyi respectively, but stopped coming to the laboratory after she became pregnant. Nonetheless, during the summer break in 1929, she accompanied Florey to Spain, where Sherrington had arranged for him to study methods of nerve staining under Santiago Ramón y Cajal. They decided to commemorate this trip by naming their daughter, who was born on 26 September 1929, Paquita Mary Joanna. Two years later they spent the summer with the French histologist and endocrinologist Pol Bouin at the University of Strasbourg, where Florey studied mucinogen, the chemical precursor to mucin.

In January 1929, Florey began a study of lysozyme, an enzyme that forms part of the immune system in animals. For Florey this was a natural extension of his work with mucus. Lysozyme occurs in secretions containing mucus, and Florey wondered if it was a property of mucus. He mastered lysozyme assay, and chemically identified it. He tested various animals for its presence; dogs, rabbits and guinea pigs all had it in their secretions, but cats had very little, and goats had none, except in their tears. In a paper published in 1930, Florey concluded that lysozyme played little part in natural immunity.

=== University of Sheffield ===
There was little prospect for promotion at Cambridge; Florey hoped that a chair of experimental medicine would be created, but this did not occur until 1945. He collaborated with biochemist Marjory Stephenson on his lysozyme project, but she did not have enough time to spare for a researcher in another department, and their results were not published. He yearned to have an interdisciplinary team and funds for work other than his own. The death of James Sholto Cameron Douglas on 30 October 1931 created a vacancy in the Joseph Hunter chair of pathology at the University of Sheffield, and Florey decided to apply.

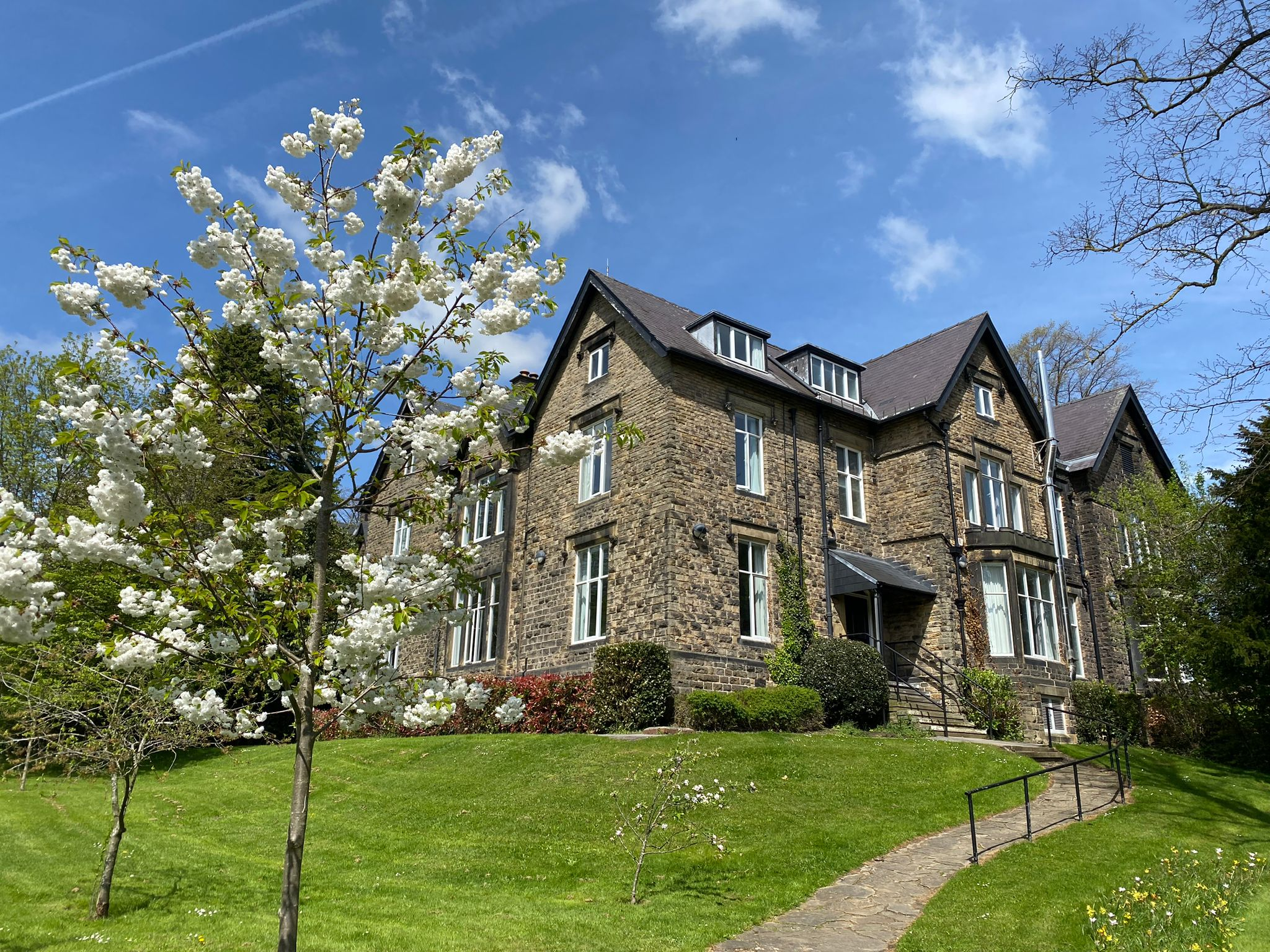
Florey Lodge, Sheffield

That Florey was not a pathologist was not overlooked; the Scottish pathologist Robert Muir declared: "There is no pathologist named Florey." The faculty board decided to take a chance on Florey, and he was appointed on 9 December. He took up the appointment in March 1932. The Floreys moved for the fourth time in five years, this time to a Victorian manor on 1 acre (0.40 ha) of ground about 1 mile (1.6 km) from the university, which later became student accommodation with the name "Florey Lodge". The chair came with a salary of £1,000 (equivalent to £57,000 in 2025) per annum, but there was no provision for an assistant. He took Kent with him anyway, eventually securing 50 shillings a week (equivalent to £141 in 2025) for him from the Medical Research Council (MRC). Guy's Hospital in London offered Florey a chair in pathology in February 1933. This caused alarm at the university, for it had recently lost two of its senior professors through the retirement of John Beresford Leathes and the departure of Edward Mellanby to become the secretary of the MRC. The university officials did not wish to lose Florey as well, and they raised his salary to £1,200 per annum to induce him to stay.

The Sheffield Medical School was small, with only about fourteen students each year. The lack of a first-rate pathologist was remedied when Beatrice Pullinger joined the staff in January 1934, and she became Florey's ally in successfully lifting the standard of research and teaching in the department. While Florey's main interest was lysozyme, he pursued other lines of research as well. The death of his brother-in-law, John Gardner, from tetanus led to an interest in treating the disease, which he pursued in collaboration with Paul Fildes and H. E. Harding. He also researched the structure and function of the lymphatic system with Pullinger, and continued his studies of contraception with Harry Carleton that had begun at London Hospital.

Florey's son Charles du Vé was born in Sheffield on 11 September 1934, but for a time Florey's relationship with Ethel had deteriorated to the point where they were communicating in writing and contemplating a legal separation. This was regarded as a serious matter; no Oxford fellow divorced without resigning his fellowship until the 1950s.

=== University of Oxford ===
Despite his success in revitalising the pathology department at Sheffield, Florey had grander ambitions than following the example of Douglas and dying in office. An opportunity arose with the death of Georges Dreyer on 17 August 1934, the holder of the chair of pathology in the Sir William Dunn School of Pathology at Oxford. Dreyer had overseen the construction of a palatial new laboratory, but by 1934 it had attracted few students and researchers. While Florey had reservations about leaving Sheffield for Guy's, he had none about Oxford. The electoral board met on 22 January 1935, and Florey was appointed Professor of Pathology and Fellow of Lincoln College, Oxford, which controlled the chair, effective 1 May 1935. The chair came with an annual salary of £1,700 (equivalent to £105,000 in 2025). The school's budget was £3,432 a year (equivalent to £211,000 in 2025) for all equipment and salaries except Florey's. He enforced strict economy measures such as forbidding the use of the lift, which saved £25 a year.

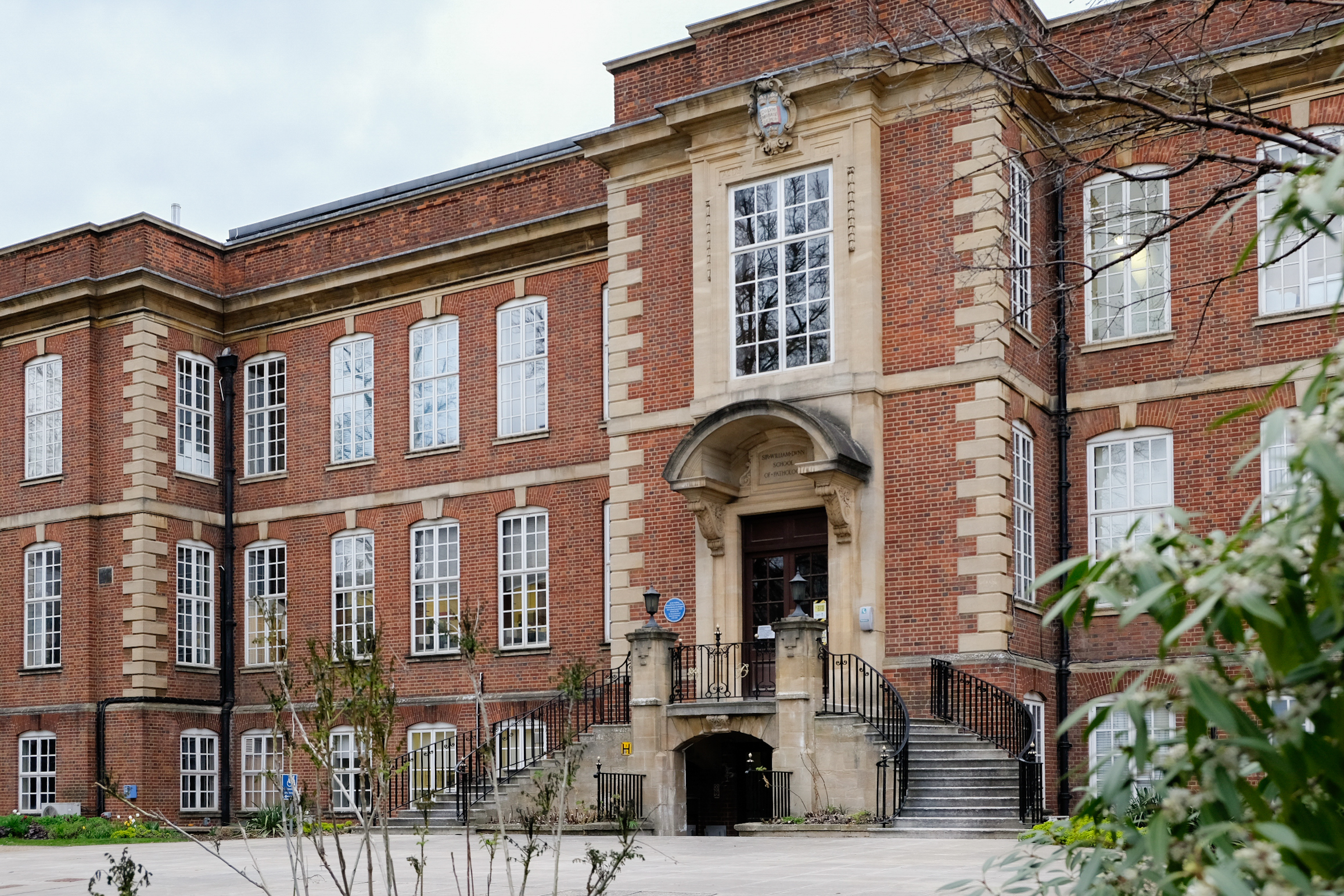
The Sir William Dunn School of Pathology in Oxford

While the building could accommodate a staff of thirty researchers, twenty-five technicians and forty to fifty students, there was only a fraction of that number, and morale was low. Florey retained Jean Orr-Ewing and Margaret Campbell-Renton, who had been working with Dreyer, and brought Kent with him. Pullinger joined them soon after as demonstrator of pathology. Florey and Pullinger restructured the pathology course. He hired Margaret Jennings as a gastroenterologist in October 1936, and she worked with him on his studies of mucus secretion. She became Florey's mistress in 1940; their affair was a poorly-kept secret. He appointed P. J. Smart as the office administrator, and she remained in the role until she retired in 1976. He attracted Rhodes Scholars such as Australian Brian Maegraith and Americans Robert H. Ebert and Leslie Epstein to the Sir William Dunn School of Pathology; other doctoral students included Peter Medawar, Gordon Sanders and Jean Taylor.

Arthur Duncan Gardner headed the MRC's Standards Laboratory, which was located on the premises, and Gardner expected that his unit would have to move out, but Florey moved to keep him, as he needed a good bacteriologist. He arranged for Gardner to become head of his bacteriological section, with the title of reader of bacteriology in 1936. The Standards Laboratory eventually moved to the MRC's laboratories at Colindale, but not until 1946.

Florey also wanted a biochemist on his staff, but this proved difficult. He acquired the services of E. A. H. Roberts with a £300 MRC grant in July 1935, and for the next two years Roberts worked with Florey and Maegraith on Florey's lysozyme project. Still, Florey wanted a biochemist on his own staff. He tried to get Hugh Macdonald Sinclair, but Sinclair declined the offer. Norman Pirie asked Florey if he could assume the role, but when Florey approached Sir Frederick Gowland Hopkins, Pirie's boss, Hopkins refused to release Pirie. He tempered this refusal by recommending Ernst Boris Chain, one of many Jewish refugees from Nazi Germany who had found sanctuary in the UK. Chain had recently completed his PhD thesis under Hopkins's supervision. He gratefully accepted Florey's offer of an appointment although it was initially for one year only, and with an annual salary of £200 (equivalent to £12,000 in 2025). In turn, Chain felt that he needed a collaborator, and he had one in mind: Norman Heatley, who was finishing his PhD in Hopkins's department. Heatley was happy to come, and Florey was able to arrange for the MRC to fund the position.

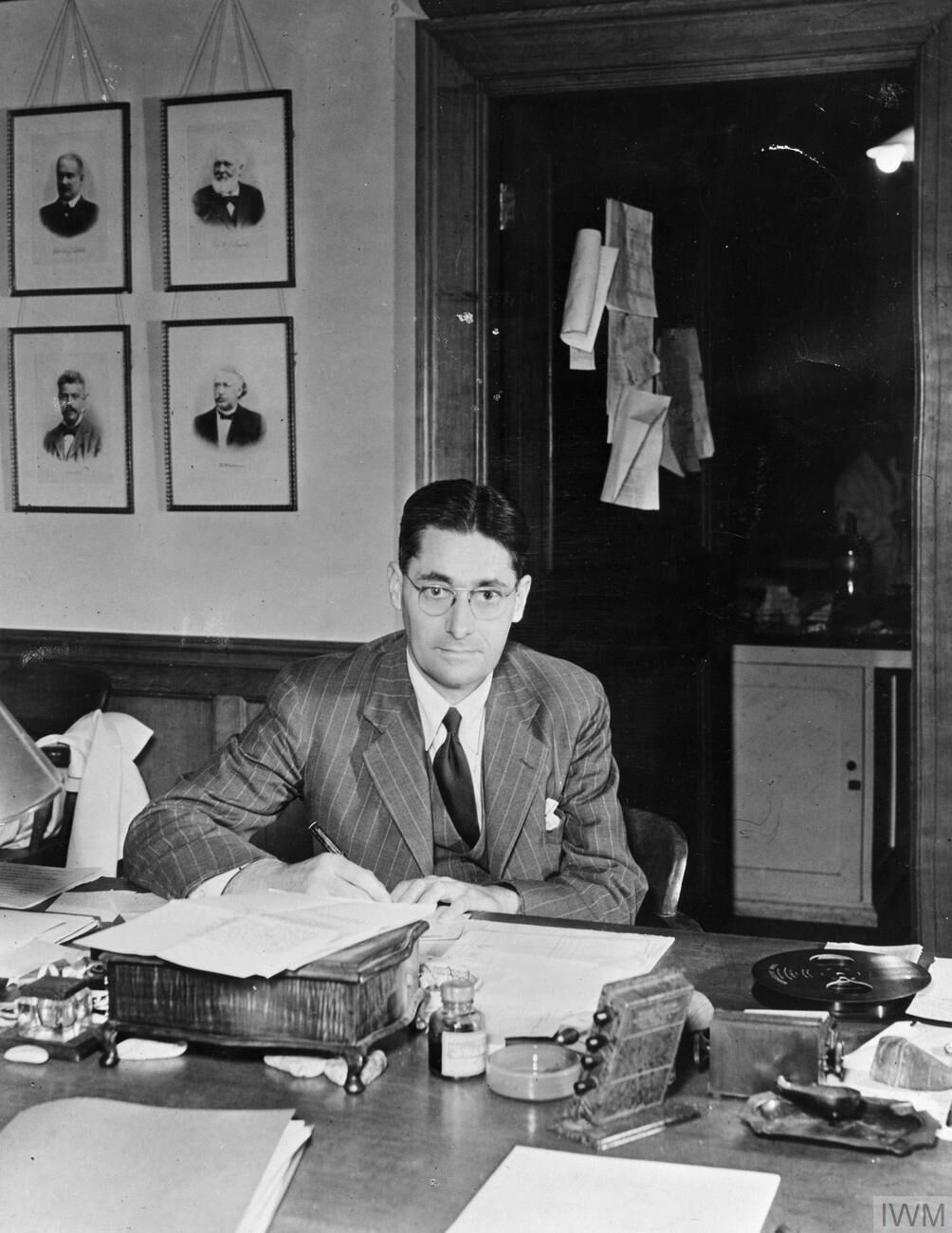
Florey in his office in 1944

In 1936, Florey received a letter from Hilda stating that their mother Bertha had terminal cancer, so he arranged to travel to Australia with Ethel, Paquita and Charles during the summer break. They travelled on the SS Orsova to Melbourne, where they were met by Bertha, Charlotte, Hilda, Valetta and Hilda's daughter Joan Gardner. In addition to spending time with his family, he visited Peter MacCallum at his laboratory. MacCallum introduced Florey to Roy Douglas (Pansy) Wright, an experimental physiologist, and they arranged for Wright to come to Oxford the following year to assist Florey and Jennings with their work on mucus secretion. Florey then joined Ethel and the children in Adelaide. The family returned to Oxford in October. Bertha died on 27 November.

Henceforth, Florey would lead an interdisciplinary team in an attack on a particular problem. Each member of the team tackled a particular aspect in their own way, with simultaneous research along different lines building up a complete picture. This was a manner of collaboration that was practically unknown in the UK at the time. However, the team members, including Florey, all worked on multiple projects at the same time. Florey was strict with his own collaborators, but gave considerable latitude to those working on other aspects of a project. He did not hold team meetings, although he encouraged team members to discuss issues with himself and each other, and he dropped by each laboratory nearly every day to view progress and provide suggestions.

The first such project was an investigation of lymphocytes. Florey developed a detailed project plan and deployed eight graduate researchers on it, including Sanders, Medawar and Taylor. Florey performed delicate surgery on rabbits to examine the effects of lymphocyte deprivation. The project, not completed for many years, resulted in several papers and advances in the understanding of the immune system.

Florey continued with his lysozyme project. Although the MRC had agreed to pay Roberts's salary, it baulked at providing money for a piece of apparatus that he required. Florey then turned to the Rockefeller Foundation for assistance, and was provided with US$1,250 (about £320)(equivalent to $29,000 in 2025). Florey and Maegraith harvested lysozyme from animals, and Roberts was able to purify it. Edward Abraham then managed to crystallize it in 1937. Chain and Epstein then studied it and determined that it was a polysaccharidase and, with Gardner's help, were able to determine its structure, and how it acted on polysaccharides. The lysozyme research was successful, but while it was lethal to micrococci, these bacteria are not usually pathogenic, and were of little concern to medicine.

== Penicillin ==
=== Development ===
In the course of his work on lysozyme, Chain read papers on the enzyme in the British Journal of Experimental Pathology by Alexander Fleming in volumes 3 and 8, and by Florey in volume 11. While doing so he came across Fleming's paper discussing the antibacterial effects of Penicillium notatum mould in volume 10. The erroneous impression given by Fleming that penicillin was a bactericidal enzyme led Chain to consider that it would be similar to lysozyme. Money was short at the time; the office had an overdraft of £500 (equivalent to £31,000 in 2025) and Florey had to forbid the purchase of any further equipment. Chain and Florey decided to create a large research project on antibacterial substances produced by micro-organisms that could attract long-term funding. Three sources were initially chosen for investigation: Bacillus subtilis, Trueperella pyogenes and penicillin mould. Florey later said:

People sometimes think that I and the others worked on penicillin because we were interested in suffering humanity. I don't think it ever crossed our minds about suffering humanity. This was an interesting scientific exercise, and because it was of some use in medicine is very gratifying, but this was not the reason that we started working on it.

Florey approached the MRC for funding in September 1939, shortly after the outbreak of the Second World War, and Mellanby authorised the project, allocating £250 (equivalent to £14,128 in 2025) to launch the project, with £300 for salaries and £100 for expenses per annum for three years. Florey felt that more would be required. On 1 November 1939, Henry M. "Dusty" Miller, Jr, from the Natural Sciences Division of the Rockefeller Foundation dropped by to discuss funding Heatley's position. Heatley had fallen out with Chain, and had accepted a new position at the Carlsberg Laboratory in Copenhagen on a Rockefeller Fellowship, but due to the outbreak of the Second World War, he had decided to remain at Oxford. Miller arranged for Heatley to retain his fellowship. Instead of working for Chain, Heatley would report directly to Florey as his personal research assistant.

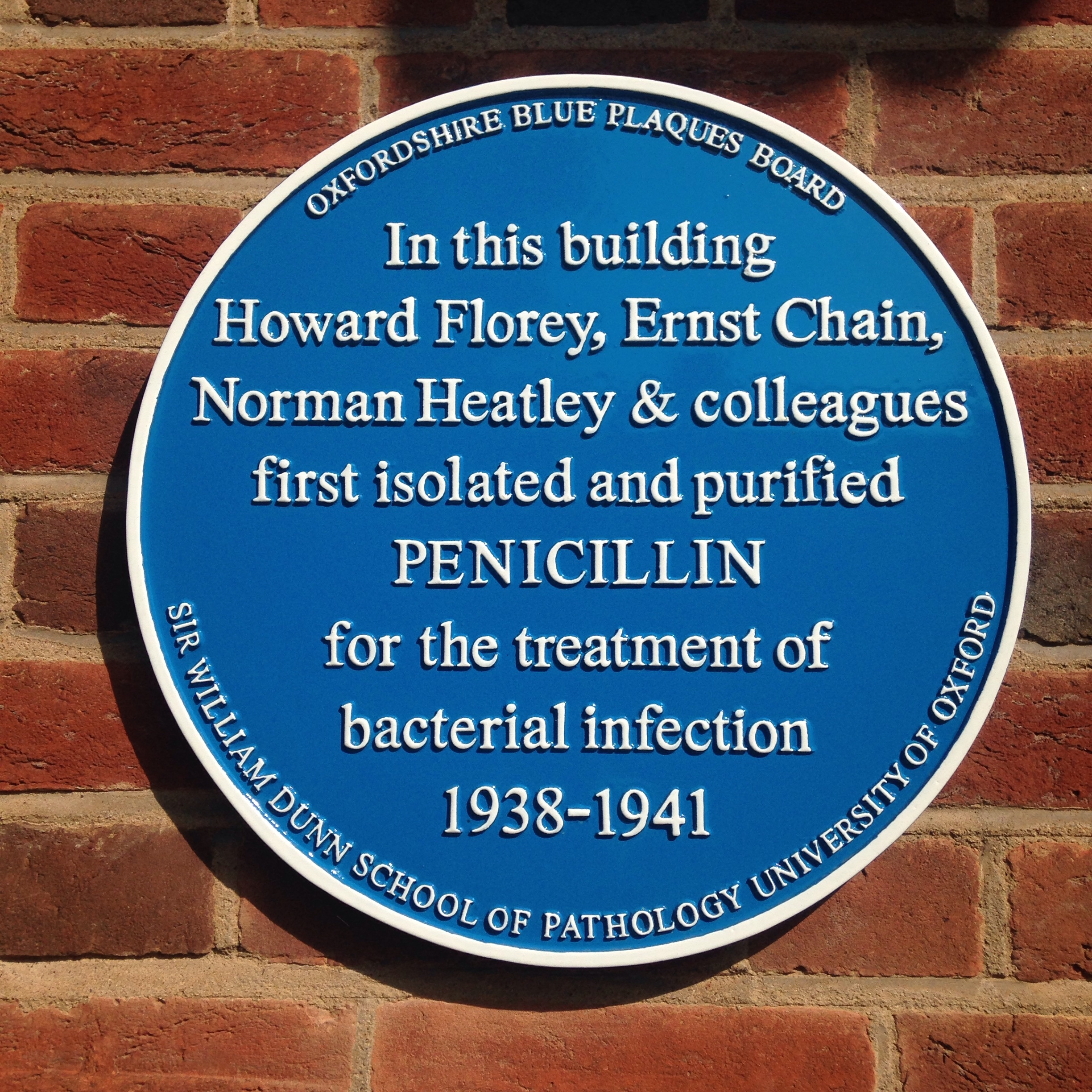
Blue plaque commemorating the isolation and purification of penicillin at the Sir William Dunn School of Pathology in Oxford

As a bacteriologist, Miller was enthusiastic about the antibacterial project; he encouraged Florey to apply for a grant from the Rockefeller Foundation, and recommended to his headquarters that the request for financial support be given serious consideration. "The work proposed", Florey wrote in his application letter, "in addition to its theoretical importance, may have practical value for therapeutic purposes." Florey's application was approved, with the Rockefeller Foundation allocating US$5,000 (£1,250) per annum for five years.

Florey's team already had a sample of penicillin mould; Dreyer had been given a sample of the mould in 1930 for his work on bacteriophages. He had lost interest in penicillin when he discovered that it was not a bacteriophage, but Campbell-Renton had continued to cultivate it. The team developed techniques for growing the mould on a surface of liquid Czapek-Dox medium. Most laboratory containers did not provide a large, flat area, so glass bottles laid on their sides were used. Later, specially-made containers were fabricated. As the laboratory gradually became a penicillin factory, Florey hired six women to perform the cultivation and extraction work. It had to be carried out under sterile conditions; Abraham and Chain discovered that some airborne bacteria produced penicillinase, an enzyme that destroys penicillin.

Heatley and Chain tackled the problem of how penicillin could be extracted from the mould. The liquid was filtered through parachute silk to remove the mycelium, spores and other solid debris. The pH was lowered by the addition of phosphoric acid and the liquid was then cooled. In this form the penicillin could be drawn off by a solvent. Initially diethyl ether was used, but it is highly flammable. At Chain's suggestion, they tried the much less flammable amyl acetate, and found that it also worked. Penicillin-bearing solvent was easily separated, but now they encountered the problem that had stymied earlier attempts: recovering the penicillin from the solvent. Heatley reasoned that if the penicillin could pass from water to solvent when the solution was acidic, maybe it would pass back again if the solution was alkaline. Florey told him to give it a try. This method, which Heatley called "reverse extraction", was found to work. Chain hit upon the idea of freeze drying to enable the water to be removed without damaging the penicillin. The team had thus developed a complete process for growing, extracting and purifying penicillin, resulting in a dry, brown powder. By early 1942, they could prepare a highly purified compound, and had proposed the chemical formula. Heatley developed an assay method. An Oxford unit was defined as the purity required to produce a 25 mm bacteria-free ring. It was an arbitrary measurement, as the chemistry of penicillin was not yet known; the first research was conducted with solutions containing four or five Oxford units per milligram. Later, highly pure penicillin became available with 2,000 Oxford units per milligram.

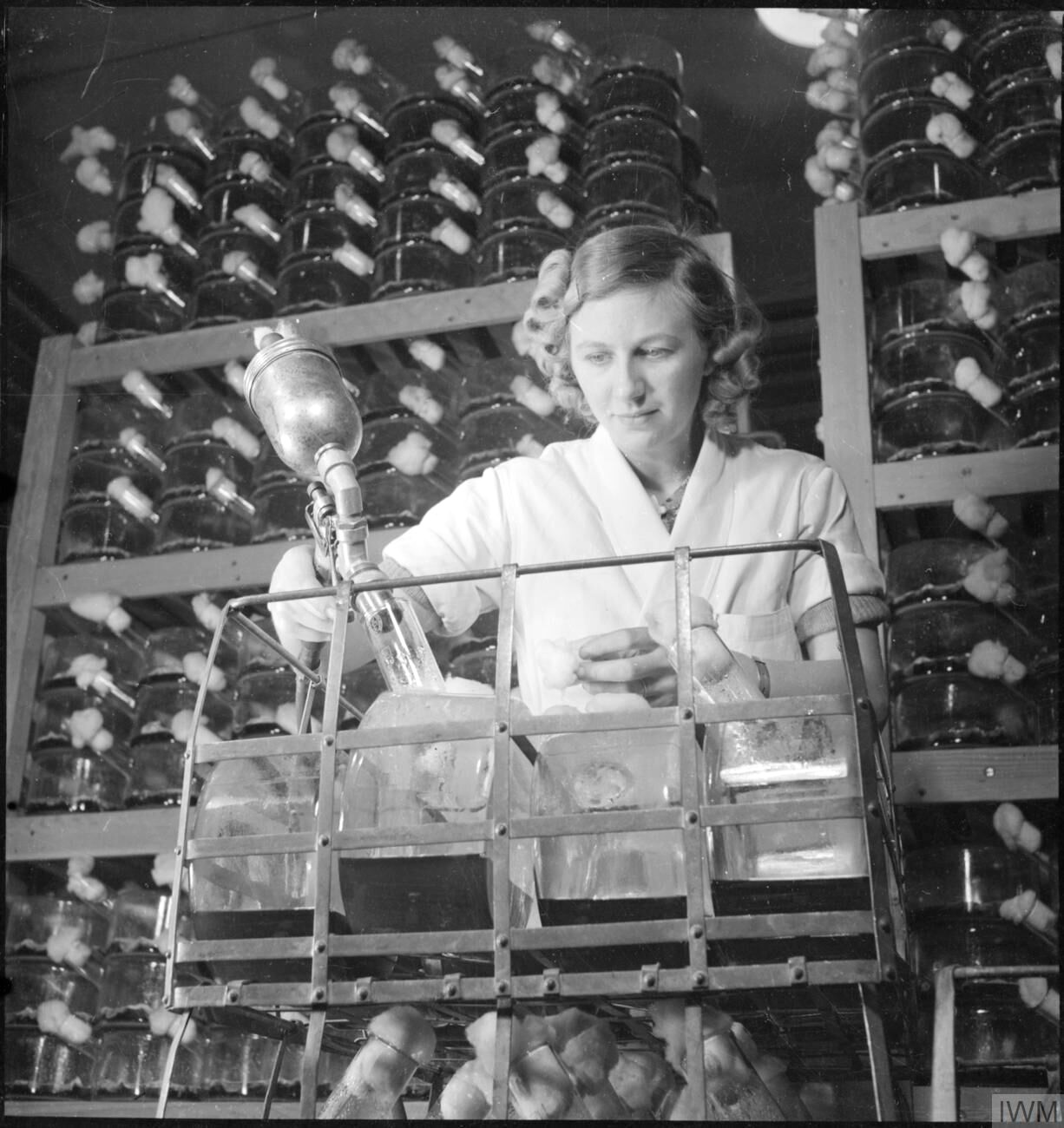
A laboratory worker sprays a solution containing penicillin mould into flasks of corn steep liquor to encourage further penicillin growth.

The team discovered that Penicillium extract killed several types of bacteria. Gardner and Orr-Ewing tested it against gonococci (against which it was most effective), meningococci, streptococci, staphylococci, anthrax bacteria, Actinomyces and the organisms that caused tetanus and gangrene. Florey and Jennings experimented on rats, mice, rabbits and cats in which penicillin was administered in various ways, and found no evidence of toxicity. On 25 May 1940, Florey injected eight mice with a virulent strain of streptococcus, and then four of them with penicillin. A day later all four of the untreated mice were dead, but all of the treated ones were still alive, although one died two days later. Over the following weeks Jennings and Florey repeated the experiment with ever-larger batches of mice, and with different bacteria. They found that penicillin was also effective against staphylococci and the bacteria that cause gangrene. They published their findings in The Lancet on 24 August 1940. Florey reminded his staff that as promising as their results were, a man weighed 3,000 times as much as a mouse.

In February 1941, Florey and Chain treated their first patient, Albert Alexander, who had had a small sore at the corner of his mouth, which then spread, leading to a severe facial infection involving streptococci and staphylococci. His whole face, eyes and scalp were swollen to the extent that he had had an eye removed to relieve the pain. Within a day of being given penicillin, he started to recover. However, the researchers did not have enough penicillin to help him to a full recovery, and he relapsed and died. Because of this experience and the difficulty in producing sufficient penicillin, Florey switched his focus to children, who could be treated with smaller quantities of penicillin.

Florey expected that penicillin would be hailed as a breakthrough, but he was disappointed; his results aroused little interest. He spent the next two years attempting to generate interest in what he believed to be the most important medical discovery of the century. He was elected a Fellow of the Royal Society in March 1941, but his work with penicillin played little part in this.

=== North American supply ===
As the war intensified with German air raids on the UK, Florey and Ethel decided to send their children away to a safer country in July 1940. The United States was not yet at war, and John Fulton, the Sterling Professor of Physiology at Yale University, and his wife Lucia agreed to care for them at their home in New Haven, Connecticut, "for the duration". In April 1941, the Rockefeller Foundation's Warren Weaver met with Florey, and they discussed the difficulty of producing sufficient penicillin to conduct clinical trials. Weaver arranged for the foundation to fund a three-month visit to the United States for Florey and a colleague so they could explore the possibility of the production of penicillin there.

Since his aim was to persuade a firm to manufacture penicillin, and Heatley knew the most about penicillin production, Florey chose to take Heatley with him, and did not tell Chain until the morning of their departure. Chain, who saw penicillin as a joint project between himself and Florey, with Heatley as a laboratory technician, was greatly offended. Chain later wrote: "I left the room silently but shattered by the experience of this underhand trick and act of bad faith, the worst so far in my experience of Florey. It spoiled my initially good relations with this man for ever."

Florey and Heatley left by air from Lisbon for the United States on 27 June 1941. In New Haven Florey met Fulton and was reunited with his children. Fulton introduced him to Ross Harrison, the Chairman of the National Research Council, and Harrison introduced him to Charles Thom, the chief mycologist at the Bureau of Plant Industry of the United States Department of Agriculture (USDA), and the man who had identified the mould reported by Fleming. Thom took them to Washington, D.C., to see Percy Wells, the acting head of the USDA's four laboratories, and Wells sent them to Orville May, the director of the UDSA's Northern Regional Research Laboratory (NRRL) in Peoria, Illinois. May arranged for them to meet with Robert D. Coghill, the chief of the NRRL's fermentation division, who raised the possibility that fermentation in large vessels (deep submergence) might be the key to large-scale production.

On 17 August, Florey met with Richards, who had become the chairman of the Medical Research Committee of the Office of Scientific Research and Development, who promised his support. Florey returned to Oxford in September without undertakings to produce the kilogram quantities of penicillin required for clinical trials, but the Japanese attack on Pearl Harbor in December 1941 brought the United States into the war and infused a new urgency into penicillin production.

Chain suggested applying for a patent on the penicillin process. His motivation was not potential profits, but the danger of it being patented elsewhere. Florey took up the issue with Sir Henry Dale, the chairman of the Wellcome Trust and a member of the Scientific Advisory Panel to the British Cabinet, and John William Trevan, the director of the Wellcome Trust Research Laboratory, but they were adamantly opposed, as they considered the notion of researchers profiting from their work as unethical. The Americans had no such scruples, and took out patents on the deep submergence processes they developed. Chain regarded Florey as naive for not patenting the penicillin production process.

=== Clinical trials ===
In addition to the increased production at the Dunn School, commercial production from a pilot plant established by Imperial Chemical Industries became available in January 1942, and Kembel, Bishop and Company delivered its first batch of 200 imperial gallons (910 L) on 11 September. Florey conducted a second series of clinical trials. Ethel was placed in charge, but while Florey was a consulting pathologist at Oxford hospitals and therefore entitled to use their wards and services, Ethel, to his annoyance, was accredited merely as his assistant. Doctors tended to refer patients to the trial who were in desperate circumstances rather than those who were the most suitable candidates for treatment, but when penicillin did succeed anyway, confidence in its efficacy rose.

Harry Lambert, a friend of Fleming's dying from a meningococcal infection, became the twelfth case on 5 August 1942. He survived, but someone at St. Mary's Hospital leaked the result to the press, resulting in an editorial in The Times on 27 August. Florey was appalled; this could only create a public demand for penicillin when all available supplies were needed for the clinical trials. On 25 September, Florey met with Sir Cecil McAlpine Weir, the Director-General of Equipment and Stores at the Ministry of Supply, who promised overriding priority for the mass production of penicillin. Ethel and Howard Florey published the results of clinical trials of 187 cases of treatment with penicillin in The Lancet on 27 March 1943.

=== North Africa ===
The Medical Research Council decided that the time had come for field trials of penicillin. The location of centres to receive the drug was kept secret so as to not provoke demand for the drug when it was still in short supply. Florey was asked to go to North Africa, where the North African campaign was ongoing. He travelled to Algiers on the hospital ship HMHS Newfoundland in May 1943. On 29 June he was joined by Hugh Cairns, another Rhodes Scholar from Adelaide, who now held the rank of brigadier in the British Army, and was in charge of St Hugh's Military Hospital (Head Injuries) in Oxford, who brought with him a stockpile of 40 million Oxford units of penicillin. Florey resisted well-intentioned efforts by the War Office to grant him military rank.

Over the next two months Florey and Cairns flew back and forth between Algiers, Sousse and Tripoli, with a week in Cairo. They treated over one hundred cases and compiled a report that ran to over one hundred pages. He gave lectures on penicillin, and his report contained recommendations for training of medical officers in its use. The fighting in North Africa ended in May 1943, so most of the cases Florey saw were not recently wounded soldiers, but ones with old wounds that had not healed; battle casualties began arriving again after the Allied invasion of Sicily in July. He considered that the source of infection in many cases was from the hospital rather than the battlefield, and advocated changes to the way that patients were treated to take advantage of the properties of penicillin. He argued that wounds should be cleaned and sealed up promptly. This was a radical idea; normally this would have been inviting gas gangrene, but Florey proposed leaving that to the penicillin. His recommendations were acted upon, and the War Office established a training course for pathologists and clinicians at the Royal Herbert Hospital, which made use of film that Florey shot in North Africa.

Although he intended that penicillin be used to treat the seriously wounded, there were large numbers of venereal disease cases, against which penicillin was particularly effective, and from a military point of view being able to cure gonorrhea in 48 hours was a breakthrough. The supply situation improved, and 20 million units per day were made available for the Allied invasion of Italy in September. Two out of three gas gangrene casualties now survived.

=== Soviet Union ===
One result of the Tehran Conference in November 1943 was an invitation for an Anglo-American scientific mission to visit the Soviet Union. The British team consisted of Florey and Sanders; the American of Albert Baird Hastings and Michael Boris Shimkin. After a month's travel via North Africa and Iran, they reached Moscow on 23 January 1944, where they met Soviet microbiologist Zinaida Yermolyeva. Florey gave her samples of penicillin, and she gave him a sample of the antibiotic Gramicidin S. He arrived back at Oxford on 29 March 1944.

=== Australia ===
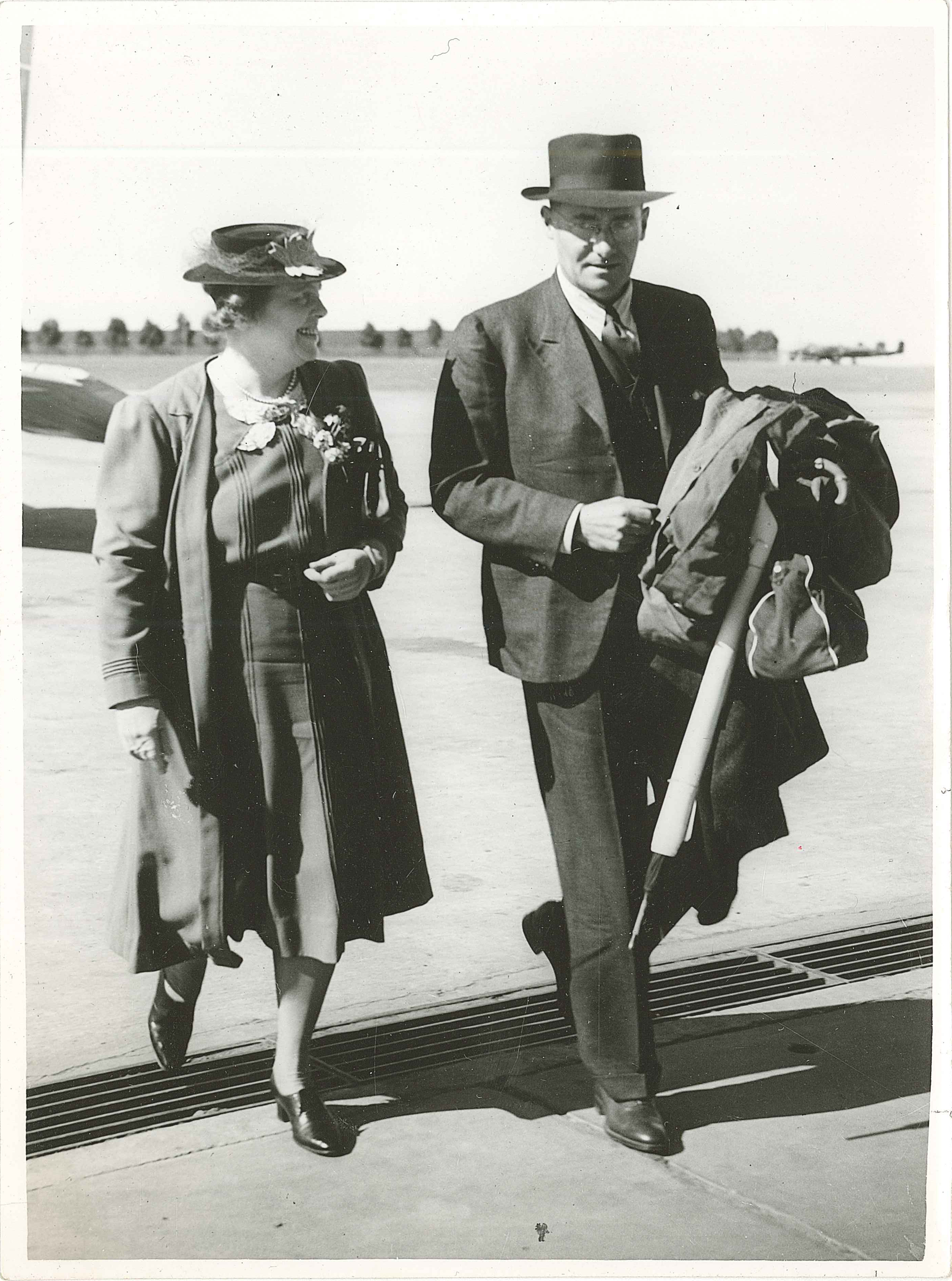
Florey with his sister Hilda Gardner on arrival in Melbourne in 1944

In May 1944, the Prime Minister, John Curtin, and the Commander-in-Chief of the Australian Army, General Sir Thomas Blamey, visited London for the 1944 Commonwealth Prime Ministers' Conference. At Blamey's request, Curtin asked Florey if he would visit Australia as an advisor on the use of penicillin. Florey arrived in Australia in August 1944 to a hero's welcome, and he was awarded the degree of Doctor of Medicine (MD) by the University of Adelaide.

In accepting the degree, he recapitulated his own career, and spoke about the need to make it easier for research to be conducted in Australia. Florey met with Blamey; the two men got along well and chatted for several hours. It ended with Blamey convinced that Florey was the man to head a project Blamey had in mind: a medical research institute in Canberra, the national capital. Blamey put his proposal to Curtin on 24 October. It was quickly approved, but Curtin became ill, and he died in July 1945.

Florey discovered that penicillin production was already underway in Australia at the Commonwealth Serum Laboratories (CSL) in Melbourne. In 1943, the War Cabinet had agreed to produce penicillin in Australia, and Colonel E. V. (Bill) Keogh, the Army's Director of Hygiene and Pathology, detailed Captain Percival Bazeley and Lieutenant H. H. Kretchmar to establish a production facility. They visited Peoria, and obtained penicillin cultures from Coghill. The first Australian-made penicillin began reaching the troops in New Guinea in December 1943. Florey was full of praise for their achievement, but disturbed that they had turned to the Americans for advice instead of him. "Am I not Australian?" he asked Keogh, "Have I not had some leading role in this thing?"

=== Recognition ===
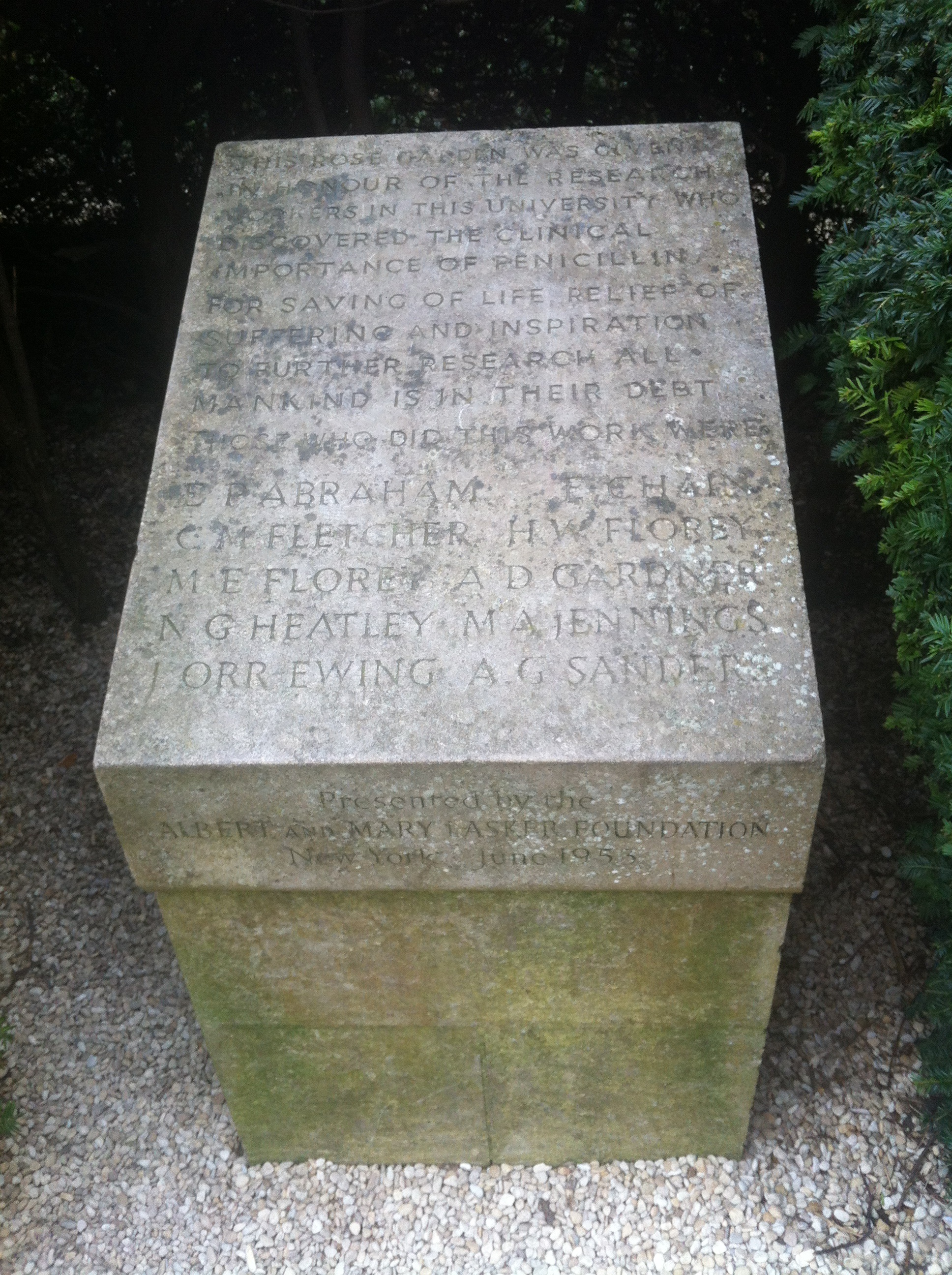
Commemorative plaque outside the Botanic Gardens, Oxford

Florey returned to the UK in October 1944, collecting his children from Fulton while en route. He was created a Knight Bachelor on 8 June 1944, and invested by King George VI at Buckingham Palace on 4 July 1944. He shared the Nobel Prize in Physiology or Medicine in 1945 with Chain and Fleming. Fleming first observed the antibiotic properties of the mould that makes penicillin, but it was Chain and Florey who developed it into a useful treatment. Isolation of the active compound from the mould depended crucially on Heatley's technical contributions, and for his part, he was awarded an honorary Doctorate of Medicine by Oxford University in 1990. Florey maintained that the penicillin project was originally driven by scientific interests, and that the medicinal discovery was a bonus. The neuroscientist W. Maxwell Cowan observed that:

Fleming was the first person Florey saved. Without Florey's work he would have gone down as a somewhat eccentric microbiologist.

Florey always insisted that the development of penicillin was a team effort and that he received more credit than he deserved, but the team itself was his creation. The philanthropist Lord Nuffield offered Florey £50,000 (equivalent to £1,866,000 in 2025) as a personal gift; Florey asked him instead to use it to establish research fellowships at the Sir William Dunn School. The first beneficiaries included Abraham, Heatley and Sanders. When the Albert and Mary Lasker Foundation asked if it could reward him, as it had the staff at Peoria, he arranged for a commemorative rose garden with a memorial stone honouring Abraham, Chain, Fletcher, himself, Ethel Florey, Gardner, Jennings, Orr-Ewing and Sanders.

== Later life ==
=== Cephalosporins ===
After the war ended, Florey directed his team at the Sir William Dunn School in the investigation of antibiotic substances produced by plants and microorganisms. They studied claviformin, proactinomycin, helvolic acid, mycophenolic acid, hirsutic acid, bacitracin and micrococcin. In 1949, they published Antibiotics: A Survey of Penicillin, Streptomycin, and Other Antimicrobial Substances from Fungi, Actinomycetes, Bacteria and Plants, a massive two-volume work. Florey also edited Lectures on General Pathology, which was published in 1954. Chain departed in 1948, but Guy Newton joined the team in his place as its biochemist. Financial support came from the Medical Research Council, the Albert and Mary Lasker Foundation, and American pharmaceutical companies.

In September 1953 Newton and Abraham isolated crystalline cephalosporin C from a fungus originally isolated by Giuseppe Brotzu in Sardinia, and found that it had antibiotic properties. Their initial evaluation of the antibiotic activity of cephalosporin C was that it was low, so Abraham sent Florey, who was in Australia, a letter asking if research should continue. Florey saw an intellectually challenging line of research, and told them to continue. They found that it was resistant to penicillinase produced by gram-positive bacteria. When he returned to Oxford, Florey and Jennings conducted a series of experiments that determined that it was not toxic to mice but could protect them against streptococci and penicillinase-producing staphylococci. The Oxford team analysed the chemical properties of the cephalosporin ring system, opening the door to the production of semisynthetic cephalosporins created through replacing side chains, as had been done with penicillin to create semisynthetic penicillins. "Everybody I have questioned who was involved in the development of cephalosporin C," science writer David Wilson reported, "when asked if one man was responsible for keeping the project going, replied: 'Florey'."

Controversy over British firms having to pay royalties to American ones for the use of the deep submergence techniques developed in the United States to produce penicillin when penicillin was seen as a British innovation led to the establishment of the National Research Development Corporation (NRDC) in June 1948. The Oxford team patented their work on cephalosporins and assigned the patents to the NRDC. By 1978, the annual world sales of cephalosporins were worth over £600,000 (equivalent to £3,279,000 in 2025) and the NRDC was reaping £100,000 (equivalent to £546,000 in 2025) a year in royalties. Florey received a 0.5 per cent share in the last two years of his life.

=== Australian National University ===
In the original design of the city of Canberra, the architect, Walter Burley Griffin, had provided for a university and had set aside land for it at the base of Black Mountain, where it would ultimately be built. Sir David Rivett chaired a committee constituted to investigate the proposed medical research institute, how much it would cost, and how it would affect existing and proposed institutions. Florey mailed Rivett a 19-page proposal on 7 April 1945. Florey envisaged a funding body in Australia similar to the Medical Research Council in the UK. The institute would be headed by a director, and have about one hundred staff, which he calculated would cost about £100,000 (equivalent to £3,732,000 in 2025). His estimate of the cost of the building was too low; Florey estimated that £240,000 (equivalent to £8,956,000 in 2025) would be enough for a building for 60 researchers, but it would eventually cost almost four times as much.

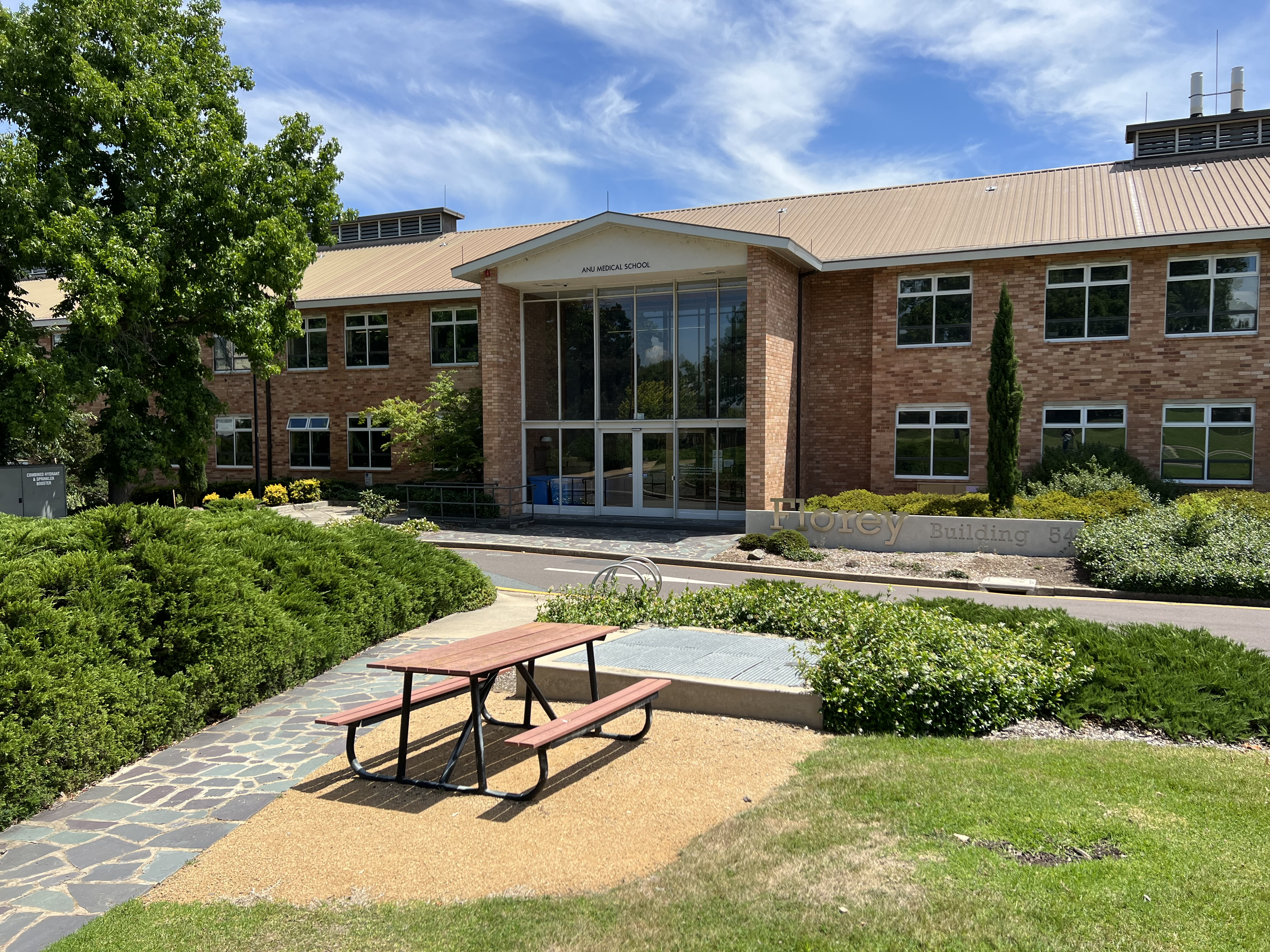
The original John Curtin School of Medical Research, now the Florey Building, at the Australian National University in Canberra

The Australian National University Act received royal assent on 1 August 1946. The act created the Australian National University (ANU), and gave the medical research institute the name "John Curtin School of Medical Research". H. C. "Nugget" Coombs, an economist and head of the Department of Post-War Reconstruction, accompanied the Prime Minister, Ben Chifley, on an official visit to the UK as his principal advisor. Coombs met with Florey in Oxford in May 1946. They agreed that the success of the new university would depend on the quality of faculty they could attract, and he wanted four eminent scholars to lead the four research schools: Florey for medicine, Mark Oliphant for physics, Keith Hancock for history, and Raymond William Firth for Pacific studies. Each received an official invitation in April 1947, and they were invited to come to Canberra for consultation in December 1947 and January 1948. They would constitute an academic advisory committee, for which they would be paid £250 (equivalent to A$20,242 in 2022) plus £200 (equivalent to A$16,193 in 2022) expenses per annum. Since they were all located in the UK, a London office of the university was opened to provide liaison.

Florey never moved to Canberra, but he did accept the position of acting director of the John Curtin School of Medical Research for a five-year term commencing in May 1948 in order to establish it. Brian Lewis had been appointed university architect, but Florey hired Stephen Welsh, the professor of architecture at Sheffield University. Outfitting a scientific building with five laboratories full of the latest world-class specialised equipment such as biosafety cabinets, cold rooms, sterilisers and incubators was never going to be cheap or simple in a relatively remote location like Canberra, and much of the equipment had to be paid for in scarce US dollars.

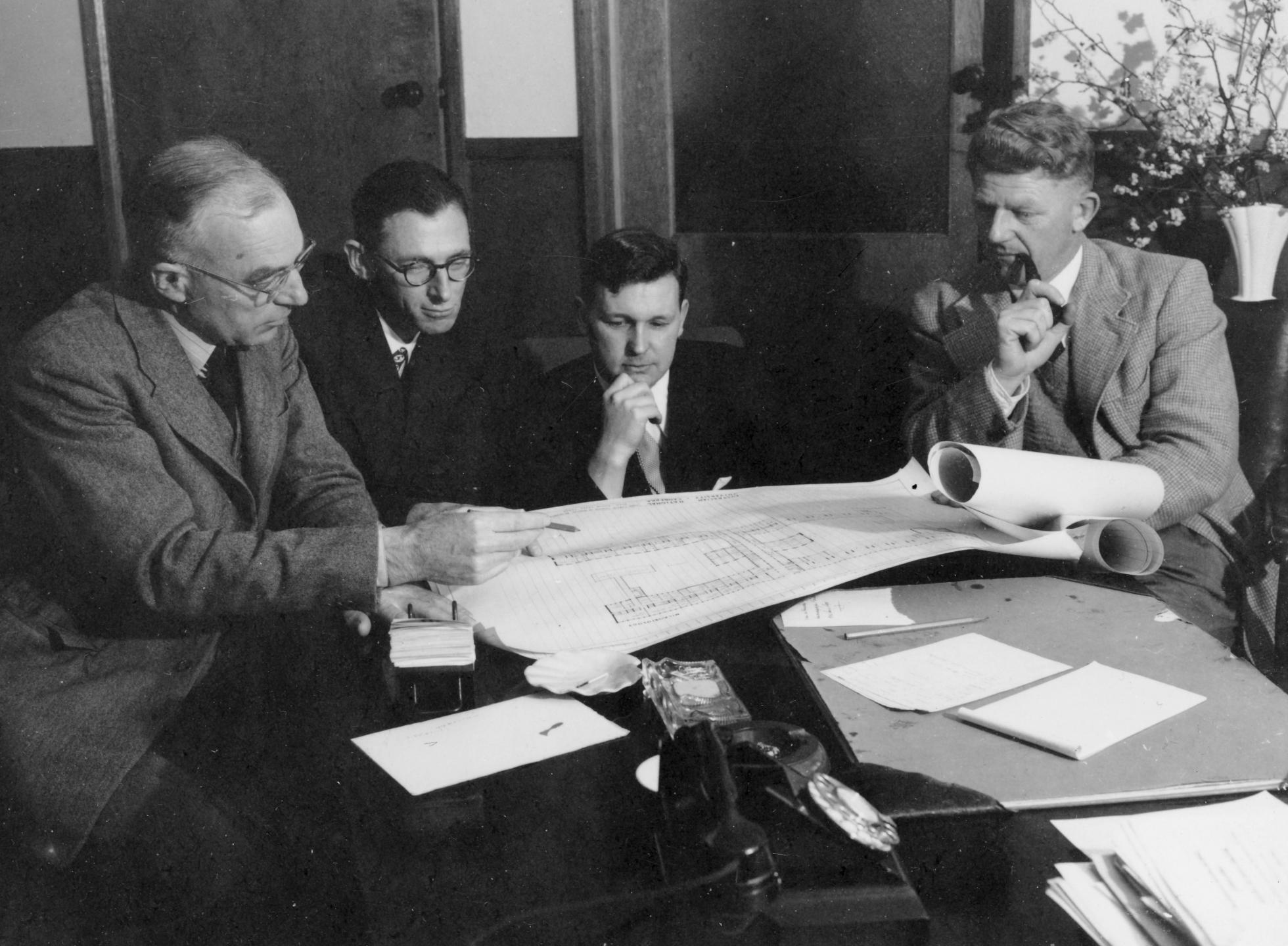
John Eccles, Adrien Albert, Frank Fenner and Hugh Ennor study the plans for the John Curtin School of Medical Research.

The Cabinet approved a 50,000-square-foot (4,600 m^{2}) building at £3 per square foot in 1947 (equivalent to A$229 in 2022), but the design Florey and Sanders agreed upon was a 235,000-square-foot (21,800 m^{2}) building at £4 per square foot (equivalent to A$306 in 2022). In 1950, the Cabinet approved £810,000 (equivalent to A$47,137,000 in 2022) for the building and £200,000 (equivalent to $11,639,000 in 2022) for equipment. People were also important, and Florey had a fairly free hand hiring his professors. He recruited Hugh Ennor as his professor of biochemistry, Adrien Albert as professor of medical chemistry, and Frank Fenner as professor of microbiology. A. F. Bunker was appointed the laboratory manager, and he outfitted the building.

Florey visited Canberra in March 1953, but he made it clear that he did not wish to continue as acting director of the John Curtin School of Medical Research, nor take up the position of director, although he reluctantly agreed to continue as an advisor. He was pessimistic about the project, writing home to Jennings that "it will be a miracle if this place can be given a real university atmosphere". By this time the project was in jeopardy; while the prime minister, Robert Menzies, supported it, a faction in the Cabinet led by Richard Casey and Wilfrid Kent Hughes did not; they were chagrined that it was named after a man they despised, and that it called itself a school when it would not train doctors. Changing the name required amending the act, and this did not occur. In November 1953, Florey was informed that works would proceed as planned.

On 27 March 1958, Florey ceremoniously opened the John Curtin School of Medical Research and received an honorary Doctor of Science degree along with Sir Norman Gregg. Menzies, Coombes, Ennor and Curtin's family were in attendance. This was not the end of Florey's association with the ANU. In 1964, he accepted the role of chancellor, a position he held from 1965 until his death in 1968.

=== President of the Royal Society ===
One of the most prestigious institutions in the UK was the Royal Society. Mellanby put Florey's name forward for membership in 1937, but at that time it accepted only twenty new members each year. He was elected a fellow in 1941. The Royal Society was governed by a council of twenty-one fellows, and Florey served on the council from 1942 to 1943, and again from 1951 to 1953, when he was vice president. He received the Royal Society's Royal Medal in 1951 and its Copley Medal in 1957. By custom, the president of the Royal Society served for five years, and the position alternated between the mathematical and physical sciences, and the biological sciences, so Florey was eligible in 1960. Since the president was a public figure, his private life had to be beyond reproach, which was a sore point due to his relationship with Margaret Jennings.

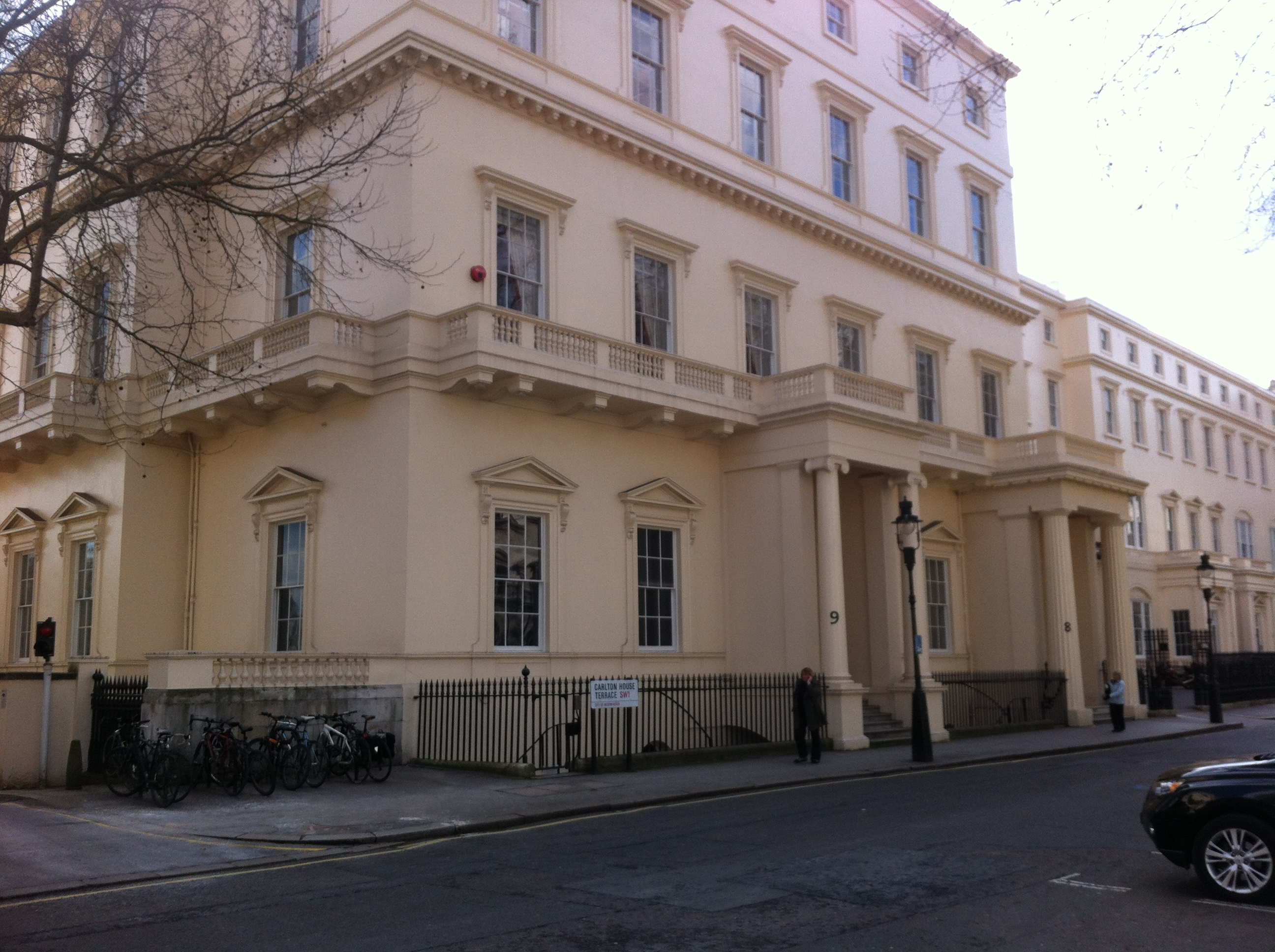
Royal Society headquarters at Carlton House Terrace

Florey became the President of the Royal Society on 30 November 1960. Since 1873, the Royal Society had occupied Burlington House. While it had a sumptuous Meeting Room and Council Room, the administrative staff, who numbered about seventy in 1960, worked in cramped conditions in the awkward-to-access offices in the attic and basement. Florey decided to seek better accommodation.

In December 1960, Florey was informed that plans to build new accommodation for the Foreign Office at Carlton House Terrace had fallen though and that the Crown Estate Commissioners had suggested that the premises might be suitable for the headquarters of cultural bodies. Florey inspected the property and lodged a formal application to occupy four houses on the site, numbers 6 to 9. Florey raised the money required to realise the architect Sir William Holford's vision for the interiors. While the government paid the rent and upkeep on the Royal Society's accommodation, about £45,000 in 1963 (equivalent to £822,000 in 2025), repairs and alterations were at the Royal Society's expense and ultimately came to around £850,000 (equivalent to £15,525,000 in 2025). The move was not completed during Florey's term of office; the new building was opened by Queen Elizabeth II on 21 November 1967.

Florey pursued a more progressive and internationalist outlook for the Royal Society. He hosted Yuri Gagarin at a luncheon at Burlington House, and led Royal Society visits to Russia in 1965 and 1967. He saw that Britain's future lay in being part of the European Economic Community, and he established ties with the European Organization for Nuclear Research (CERN), the European Molecular Biology Organization (EMBO) and the European Space Research Organization (ESRO). In 1959, the Royal Society provided for only one research fellowship, the Foulerton Professorship, but in 1961, at his suggestion, the Henry Dale Research Professorship was created for a researcher in physiology and pharmacology. Government funding was provided to create three more professorships in 1964, and another two in 1967. Reflecting his attempt to move with the times, a chair was established for the social sciences, and two new lecture series were instituted, for technology and the behavioural sciences. Aware of the acute danger of overpopulation that the life-saving drugs that he had pioneered could cause, he established a population study group, and in 1967, he became the president of the Family Planning Association.

=== Provost of Queen's College, Oxford ===
As he approached the age of sixty, Florey faced mandatory retirement. He had to vacate the university house he had occupied since 1935, which was subsequently demolished, with a new school erected on the site. He bought a parcel of land in Marston, Oxford, and built a house on it. No sooner had they moved in than Florey accepted the position of Provost of The Queen's College, Oxford, to which he was elected on 25 June 1962, and he moved into the provost's lodgings. This meant relinquishing his chair at the Sir William Dunn School. He was succeeded by Henry Harris, a fellow Australian scientist who had been invited to study at the Sir William Dunn School by Florey in 1952 on an ANU scholarship. Florey was the first provost of Queen's College with no prior association with the college as an undergraduate, graduate researcher or fellow, and the first scientist. The role was closely associated with the academic establishment, of which he had been critical, but he could stay until 1971, the lodgings came with a housekeeper, and he could make use of its facilities to entertain visiting scientists and dignitaries. Florey had a lift installed to make it easier for Ethel and himself to reach the upstairs bedrooms.

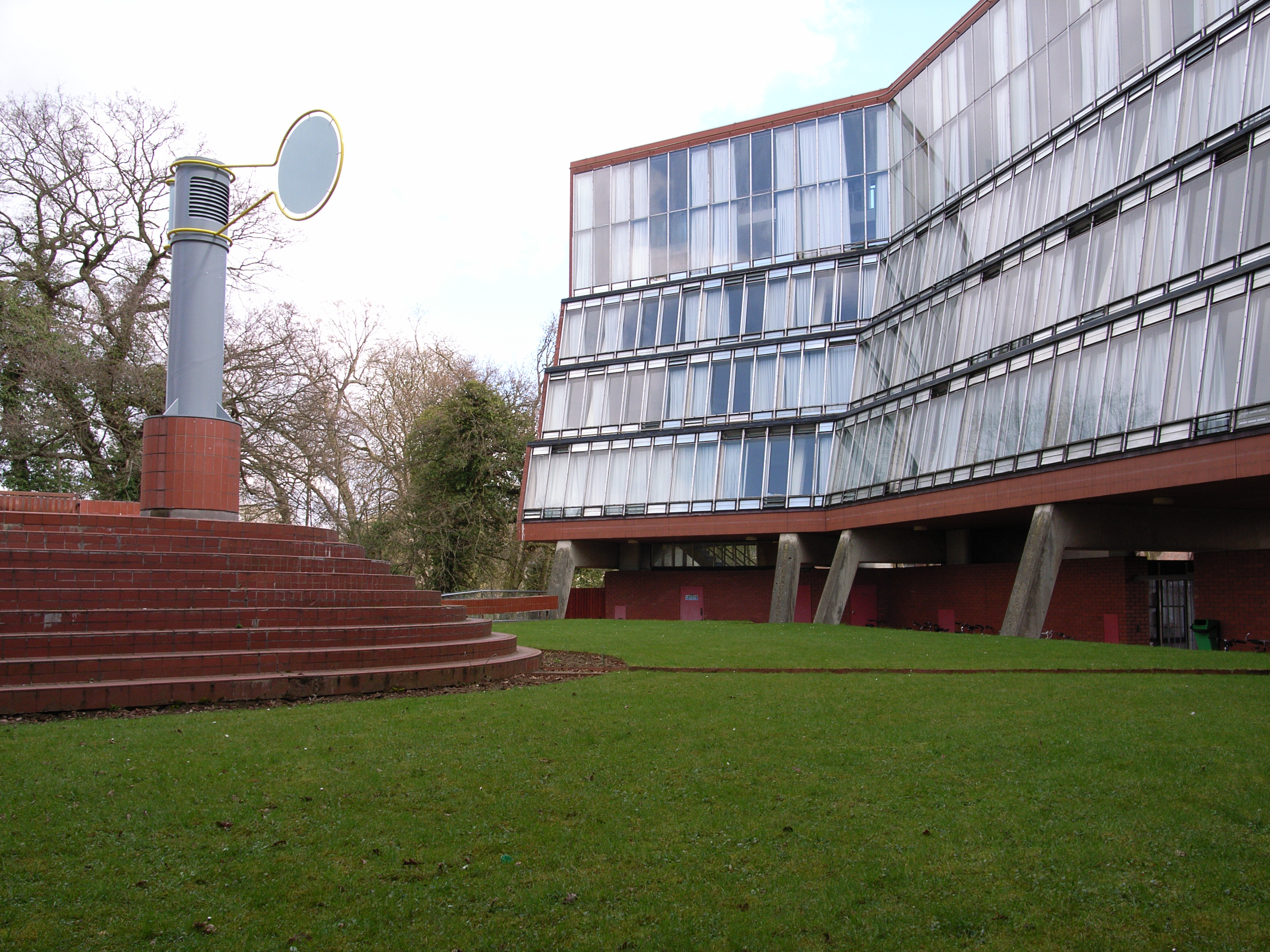
The Florey Building in Oxford

Based on his own experience as a Rhodes Scholar, Florey created a version for European students. The European Studentship scheme provided support for graduates from eleven western European and Scandinavian countries with an annual stipend of £1,100 (equivalent to £16,000 in 2025) for two years. Florey raised the money for nine studentships. Florey did not live to see the first studentship awarded in 1969, and without him additional funding was not forthcoming and the money was exhausted by 1980. By then 76 students had benefited from the scheme, and they had published 15 books and 250 articles in peer-reviewed journals.

During his term as provost, there was a major construction program to provide enough accommodation for all undergraduates to be able to spend at least two years in residence. This involved three developments, the largest of which was Florey's personal project: the construction of a new building on the River Cherwell at St Clement's, Oxford. The cost was substantial—the purchase price of the site alone was £500,000 (equivalent to £9,133,000 in 2025)—but Florey was accustomed to raising large sums of money. It was designed by the British architect Sir James Stirling. Florey died the day that construction work was scheduled to begin. When the building was opened in 1971, it was named the Florey Building in his honour. Buildings were also named after Florey in Adelaide, Melbourne, and Canberra, where his refurbished original John Curtin School of Medicine Building was renamed the Florey Building in 2015.

=== Personal life ===
Ethel Florey's health deteriorated. She had hypertension and respiratory and heart problems, and walked with a stick. She travelled to Australia one more time in 1965 to give lectures on penicillin, but collapsed in Canberra and was hospitalised in Sydney. She recovered sufficiently to return to Oxford. When she found out that her son Charles was getting married at Fulton's house in New Haven in 1966, she wanted to attend. Florey refused to pay for this; if she collapsed in the United States the cost of medical care would be astronomical. Robert Webb, an American friend from the Cambridge days arranged for US$5,000 (equivalent to $50,000 in 2025) of insurance cover to allow her to attend. She died in Oxford on 10 October 1966.

On 6 June 1967, Florey married Margaret Jennings at the Old Register Office in St Giles', Oxford, in a ceremony deliberately kept as quiet as possible. The only other persons present were Jim Kent and Cecilia Little, Jennings's housekeeper, who acted as witnesses. There was a small celebration in Florey's rooms at Queen's College and they honeymooned in the Caribbean before visiting Fulton in New Haven.

== Honours and awards ==
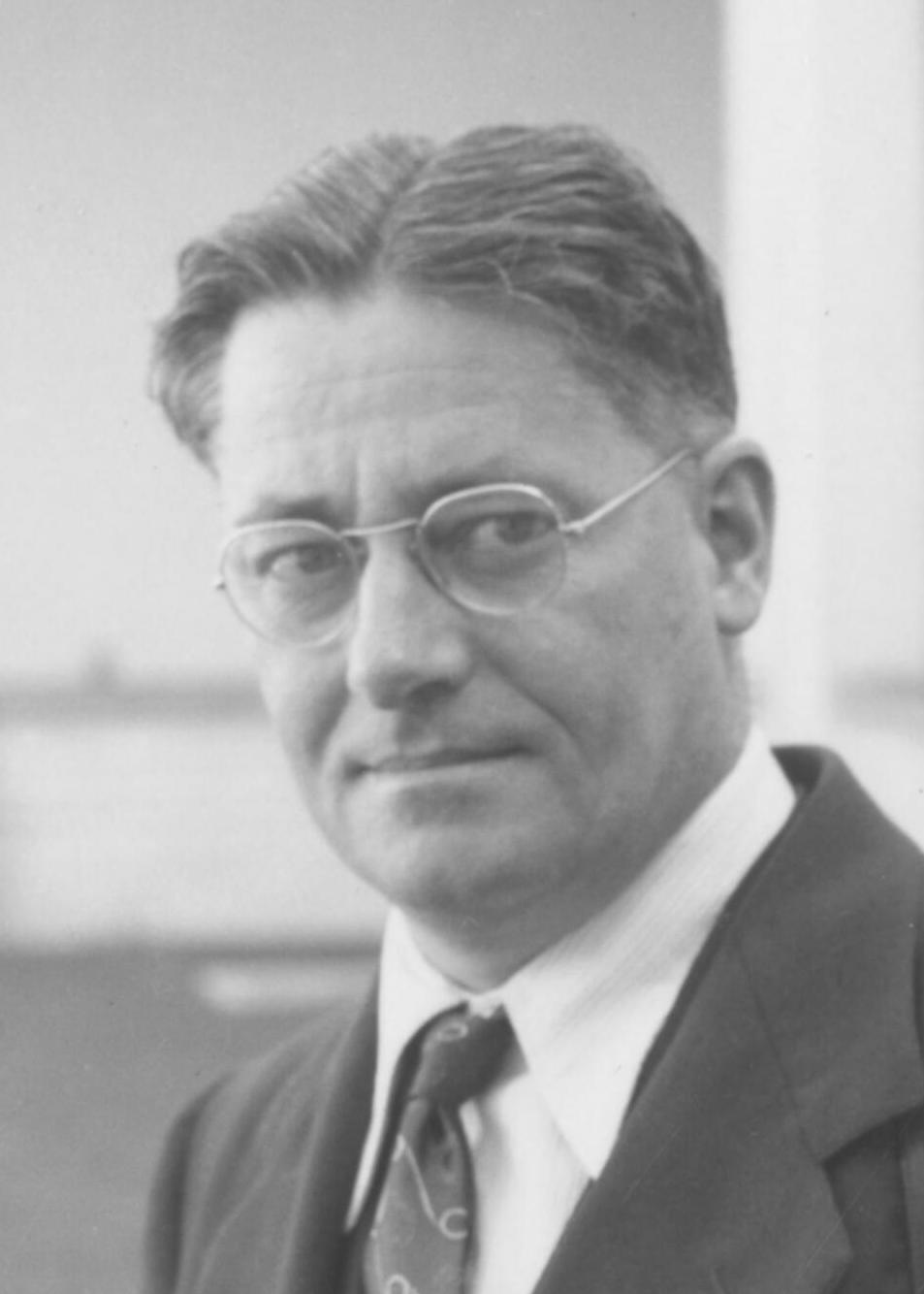
Florey in 1960

Florey was awarded the Cameron Prize for Therapeutics of the University of Edinburgh and the Lister Medal in 1945, for his contributions to surgical science. The corresponding Lister Oration, given at the Royal College of Surgeons of England later that year, was titled "Use of Micro-organisms for Therapeutic Purposes". He was awarded many honorary degrees from British and foreign universities, including University of São Paulo in Brazil. He won the Gold Medal of the Royal Society of Medicine in 1947. He became a commander of the French Legion of Honour in 1946 and was awarded the American Medal for Merit in 1948 and the James Smithson Medal in 1965.

Florey was elected to the United States National Academy of Sciences and the American Philosophical Society in 1963, and was elected to the American Academy of Arts and Sciences the following year. He became an honorary Fellow of the Royal College of Surgeons in 1961.

On 4 February 1965, Florey was created a life peer and became Baron Florey, of Adelaide in the Commonwealth of Australia and of Marston in the City of Oxford. This was a higher honour than the knighthood awarded to Sir Alexander Fleming, and it recognised the monumental work Florey had done in making penicillin available in sufficient quantities to save millions of lives. He was formally introduced to the House of Lords in April, sponsored by Lord Cottesloe, Margaret Jennings's brother, and Lord Adrian, one of Florey's predecessors as President of the Royal Society. On 15 July 1965 he was appointed a member of the Order of Merit.

== Death ==
Florey published his last scientific paper, co-written with Jennings, in 1967. He had written or co-written over two hundred papers. He died at his home at the provost's lodgings, of congestive heart failure on 21 February 1968. Although Florey was an agnostic, a funeral service was held in the St. Nicholas' parish church in Marston. A memorial plaque was placed on the outside wall near the entrance; the church refused to allow it to be placed inside because Florey had been so outspoken in his disbelief. A larger service at Westminster Abbey in London was attended by about 500 people. His remains were cremated.

In 1980, Lady Hamilton Fairley, the widow of Sir Neil Hamilton Fairley began a campaign to have a memorial to Florey in London. The Premier of South Australia, David Tonkin, agreed to provide South Australian marble for a memorial stone. South Australian sculptor Paul Trappe was commissioned to engrave it from a design by John Peters. The 60-by-90-centimetre (24 by 35 in) stone was flown to London by the Royal Australian Air Force, and unveiled by Lady (Margaret) Florey on 2 November 1981. The inscription on the stone reads:

In grateful memory of
HOWARD WALTER BARON FLOREY O.M.
His vision, leadership and research made penicillin available to mankind.
Born Adelaide 1898 Died Oxford 1968

== Posthumous honours and legacy ==
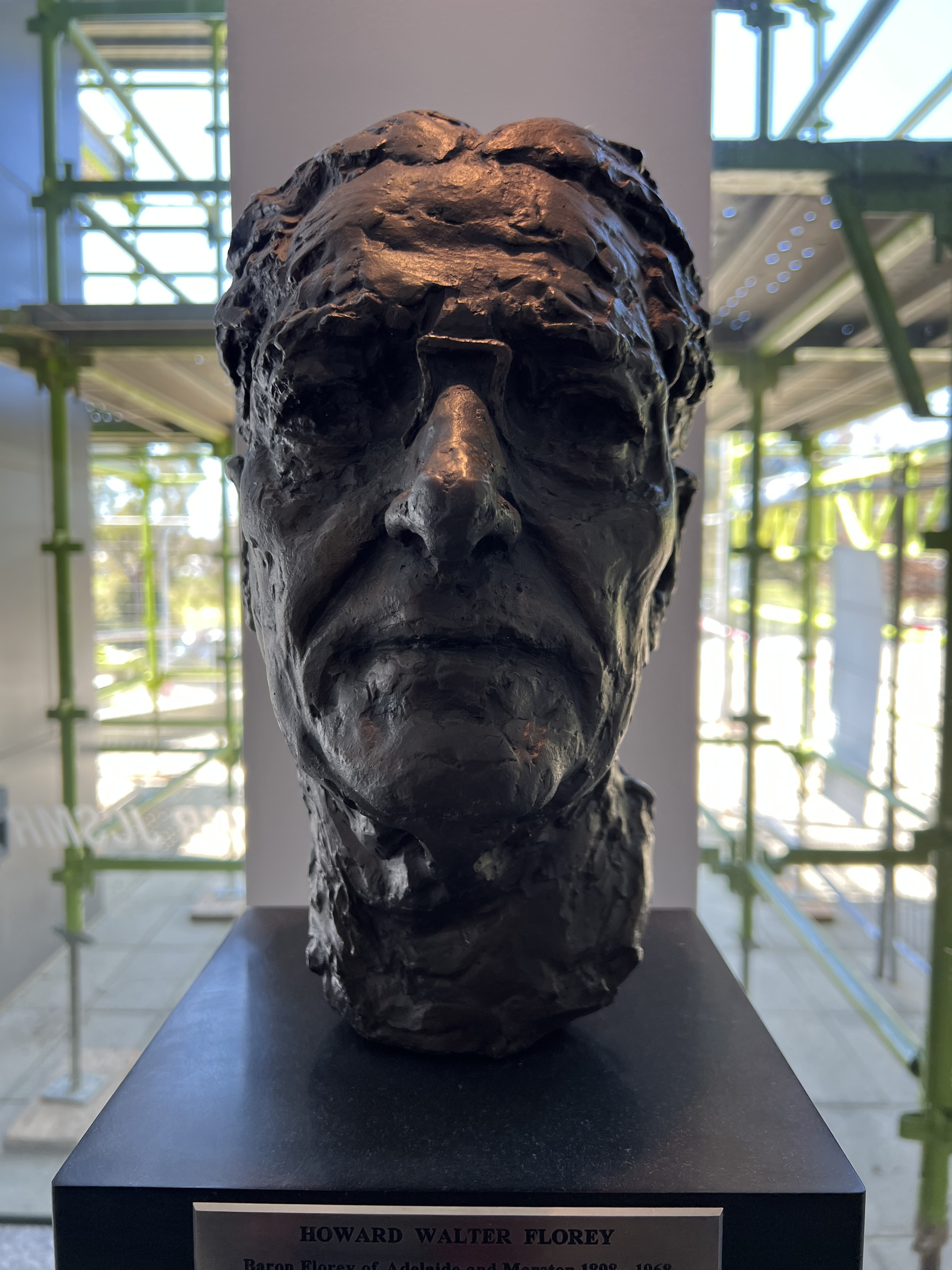
Bust of Howard Florey by John Dowie in the John Curtin School of Medical Research at the Australian National University

Florey's portrait appeared on the Australian fifty-dollar note for 22 years between 1973 and 1995. The note also depicted the Sir William Dunn School of Pathology, Penicillin notatum, mice used in penicillin experiments, colonies of mould inhibiting bacterial growth on a Petri dish, and Heatley's assay method.

The street of Florey Drive and suburb of Florey in the Australian Capital Territory, the Florey Institute of Neuroscience and Mental Health at the University of Melbourne, Victoria, the Florey Unit of the Royal Berkshire Hospital in Reading, Berkshire, the Florey Institute for Host–Pathogen Interactions at the University of Sheffield, and a lecture theatre in the University of Adelaide's medical school are named after him. The Electoral district of Florey, a single-member electoral district for the South Australian House of Assembly, is also named after him. Florey crater near the lunar north pole was named after him in 2009.

It was estimated that the development of penicillin saved over 80 million lives.

== In film ==
Penicillin: The Magic Bullet is a 2006 Australian film production written by Gordon Glenn and financed by the Film Finance Corporation and Arcimedia Productions in association with Film Victoria. Breaking The Mould is a 2009 historical drama that tells the story of the development of penicillin in the 1930s and 1940s, by the group of scientists at Oxford headed by Florey at the William Dunn School of Pathology. The film stars Dominic West as Florey, Denis Lawson as Fleming, and Oliver Dimsdale as Chain; and was written by Kate Brooke and directed by Peter Hoar.

== Notes ==
Academic offices
Preceded by John Cockcroft	3rd Chancellor of the Australian National University; 1965–1968	Succeeded by H. C. Coombs
Professional and academic associations
Preceded by Cyril Norman Hinshelwood	51st President of the Royal Society; 1960–1965	Succeeded by Patrick Blackett
