= Hilda Gardner =

Australian bacteriologist (1890–1953)

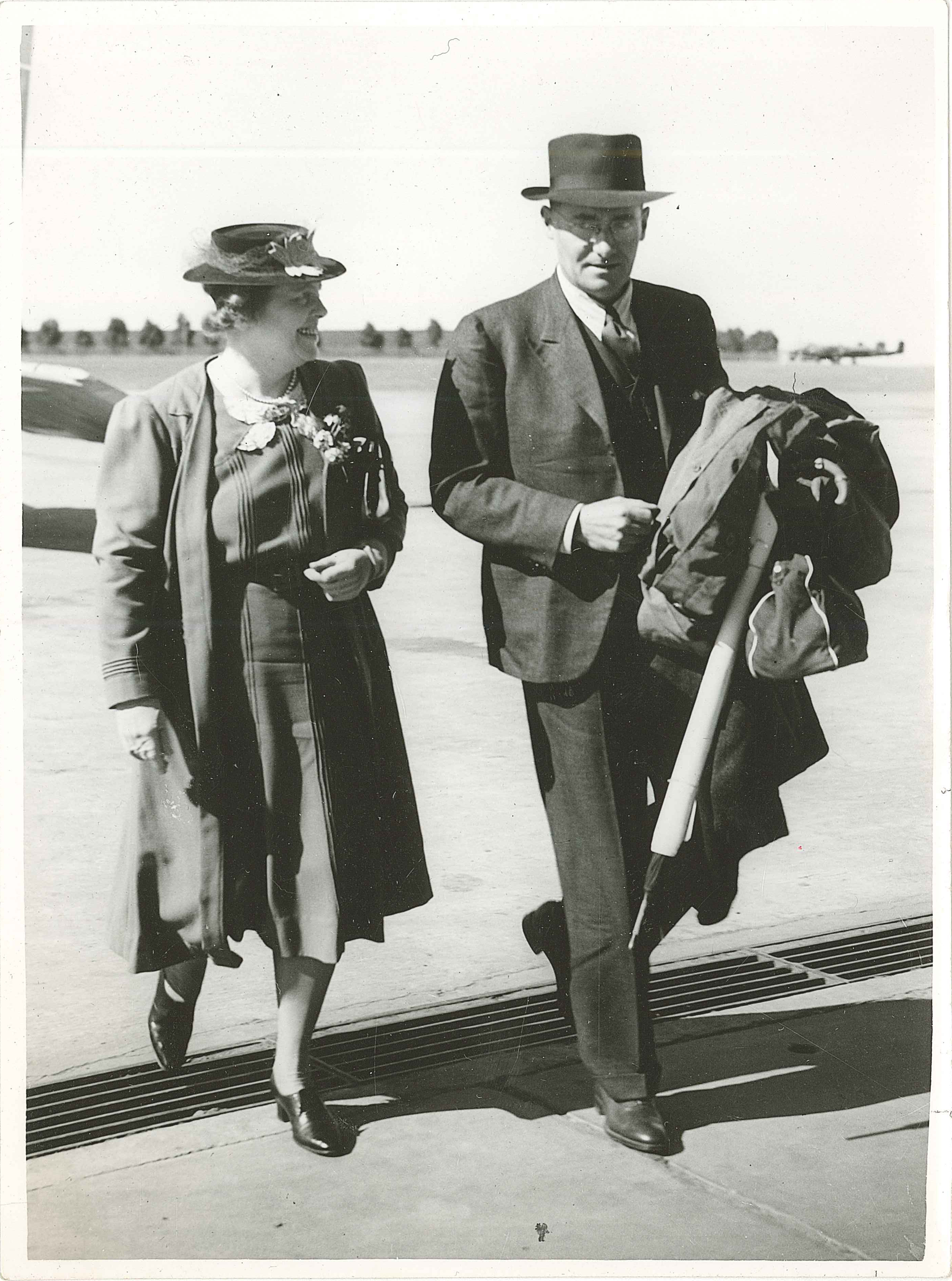
Hilda Gardner (left) arriving in Melbourne with her brother, Howard Florey, in 1944

Hilda Josephine Gardner (née Florey; 6 September 1890 – 18 May 1953) was an Australian bacteriologist, who was a pioneer of laboratory medicine in Australia, specialising in infections and infectious diseases.

Gardner completed a Bachelor of Medicine, Bachelor of Surgery (MBBS) from the University of Adelaide in 1912. She undertook residencies in several Adelaide hospitals, before moving to Melbourne to take up a role at the Royal Women's Hospital, and later the Royal Melbourne Hospital (RMH) where she spent the rest of her career as the hospital's only bacteriologist and haematologist working from a small laboratory at the Walter and Eliza Hall Institute, and training many doctors, pathologists and laboratory technicians through a formal training program she initiated at the RMH.

Gardner was the sister of Nobel Prize laureate Howard Florey. Her daughter, Joan Gardner, was also a renowned microbiologist and infection control expert.
