= Margaret Jennings (bacteriologist) =

British scientist (1904–1994)

The Honourable Margaret Jennings
- Born: Margaret Augusta Fremantle; 2 December 1904; Swanbourne, England
- Died: 14 November 1994 (aged 89)
- Known for: Penicillin research
- Spouse(s): Denys Jennings (m. 1930; div. 1946) Howard Florey (m. 1967; died 1968)
- Parent: Thomas Fremantle

Margaret Augusta Jennings, Baroness Florey (née Fremantle; 2 December 1904 – 14 November 1994) was a British scientist who was part of the group at the University of Oxford under Howard Florey who worked on the clinical application of penicillin.

== Education and career ==
Jennings read Philosophy, Politics, and Economics at Lady Margaret Hall, Oxford, from 1924. She joined the University of Oxford's Sir William Dunn School of Pathology under Howard Florey in 1936. By 1938, she was part of the team led by Florey investigating the production and applications of penicillin. Jennings undertook animal work as well as research on bacteriology. As part of testing, Jennings assayed the toxicity of penicillin extracts against white cells of the blood.

== Personal life ==
Margaret married Denys Arthur Jennings in 1930, but the couple divorced in 1946. After 21 years, Jennings married Howard Florey, her long-time colleague and penicillin researcher, in 1967 after the death of his first wife Mary Ethel Florey.
