= Mary Ethel Florey =

Australian physician (1900–1966)

Mary Ethel Hayter Florey, Baroness Florey (née Reed; 1 October 1900 – 10 October 1966) was an Australian doctor and medical scientist. Her work was instrumental in the discovery of penicillin. She was part of the team that ran the first trials on penicillin and first administered the drug in a human trial. Part of her research has been summarized in a four volume book on antibiotics published from 1952 to 1960.

== Life, education and career ==
Ethel Florey was born on 1 October 1900.

She obtained a Bachelor of Medicine (MB) and a Bachelor of Surgery (BS) from the University of Adelaide in 1924. In 1950, she obtained her Doctor of Medicine (MD) from the University of Adelaide.

From 1939 to 1941, she worked at the Oxford Regional Blood Transfusion Service. Starting in 1941, she was part of the team working on clinical trials at the Radcliffe Infirmary, military hospitals and the Birmingham Accident Hospital. This is where she ran the first clinical trials of penicillin in 1941 along with her lab partner and husband Howard Walter Florey, leading to him winning the Nobel Prize.

She published her research in a multivolume book titled The Clinical Application of Antibiotics.

== Discovery of penicillin ==
She worked along with Howard Walter Florey and carried out the first clinical trials of penicillin in 1941 at the Radcliffe Infirmary in Oxford on the first patient, a police constable from Oxford named Albert Alexander. Ethel Florey introduced police constable and first patient to Howard Florey. The patient started to recover, but subsequently died because they were unable, at that time, to make enough penicillin. It was the Florey team who actually made a useful and effective drug out of penicillin, after the task had been abandoned as too difficult. Mary Ethel Florey's work included administrating and recording "the clinical progress of the first large-scale trial of 187 cases of sepsis".

Her major academic contribution is a four volume book titled The Clinical Application of Antibiotics. The first volume is dedicated to Penicillin and her research on that topic. The British Journal of Surgery published a review on the book in 1953 reading: "It is a veritable encyclopaedia for the use and abuse of penicillin. It surely must take its place in the library of every hospital as valuable work of reference, not only for the clinician but also the pathologist. The author and publisher are to be congratulated on its format and method of presentation." The volume on Penicillin also offered examples of misuse of antibiotics and warnings on dosage.

== Personal life ==
Mary Florey met Howard Walter Florey in 1921 in Adelaide and married him on 19 October 1926 as the couple moved to London. According to the Australian Dictionary of Biography, "the marriage was to be unhappy, due in part to her poor health and in part to his intolerance". They had two children, Paquita Mary Joanna and Charles du Vé (also a physician).

Her husband Howard Florey, who won the Nobel prize for his role in the discovery of penicillin, said of Mary Florey: "It must never be forgotten that if it wasn’t for Ethel penicillin would not have been introduced into medical practice when it was".

Her photography is in the collections of the National Portrait Gallery.

== Bibliography ==
- The Clinical Application of Antibiotics, Vol. I. Penicillin, 1952.
- The Clinical Application of Antibiotics, Vol. II. Strptomycin and Other Antibiotics Active against Tuberculosis, 336 pages.
- The Clinical Application of Antibiotics, Vol. III, Chloramphenicol and the Tetracyclines. Oxford University Press, London, 393 pages, 1957.
- The Clinical application of Antibiotics. Vol. IV. Erythromycin and Other Antibiotics, 303 pages, 1960.
