= Charles du Vé Florey =

British physician

Professor The Honourable Charles du Vé Florey
- Born: September 11, 1934 (age 92)
- Spouse: Susan Hopkins
- Children: 2
- Parent(s): Howard Florey; Ethel Reed

Academic work
- Discipline: Medicine
- Sub-discipline: Epidemiology
- Institutions: University of Dundee

Charles du Vé Florey (born 11 September 1934) is a British public health physician and epidemiologist who is known for his work on the effects of air pollution on respiratory health.

== Background ==
Florey is the son of Ethel Reed and Howard Florey who was appointed a life peer—Baron Florey—for his role in the development of penicillin. As the son of a peer, he is entitled to use the title "The Honourable". Florey married Susan Hopkins with whom he had two children.

Florey was educated at Rugby School and then went up to Cambridge University, where he graduated in 1956 as a BA. He proceeded to University College London, where he graduated as MB, BCh in 1961. He then went to Yale University and obtained a further degree, as Master of Public Health (MPH) in 1963.

== Career ==
- Reader in Community Medicine, Department of Community Medicine, St Thomas’s Hospital Medical School, London
- Professor of Public Health Medicine (formerly Community Medicine), University of Dundee

== Awards and Positions ==
1994 - Chair, Society for Social Medicine

== Key publications ==
Charles du V Florey, Peter Burney, Michael D’Souza, Ellie Scrivens and Peter West: "An Introduction to Community Medicine". London: Heinemann, 1983.

Charles du V Florey and Stephen Leeder: "Methods for Cohort Studies of Chronic Airflow Limitation." WHO Regional Office for Europe, 1982.
