= History of penicillin =

Aspect of medical history

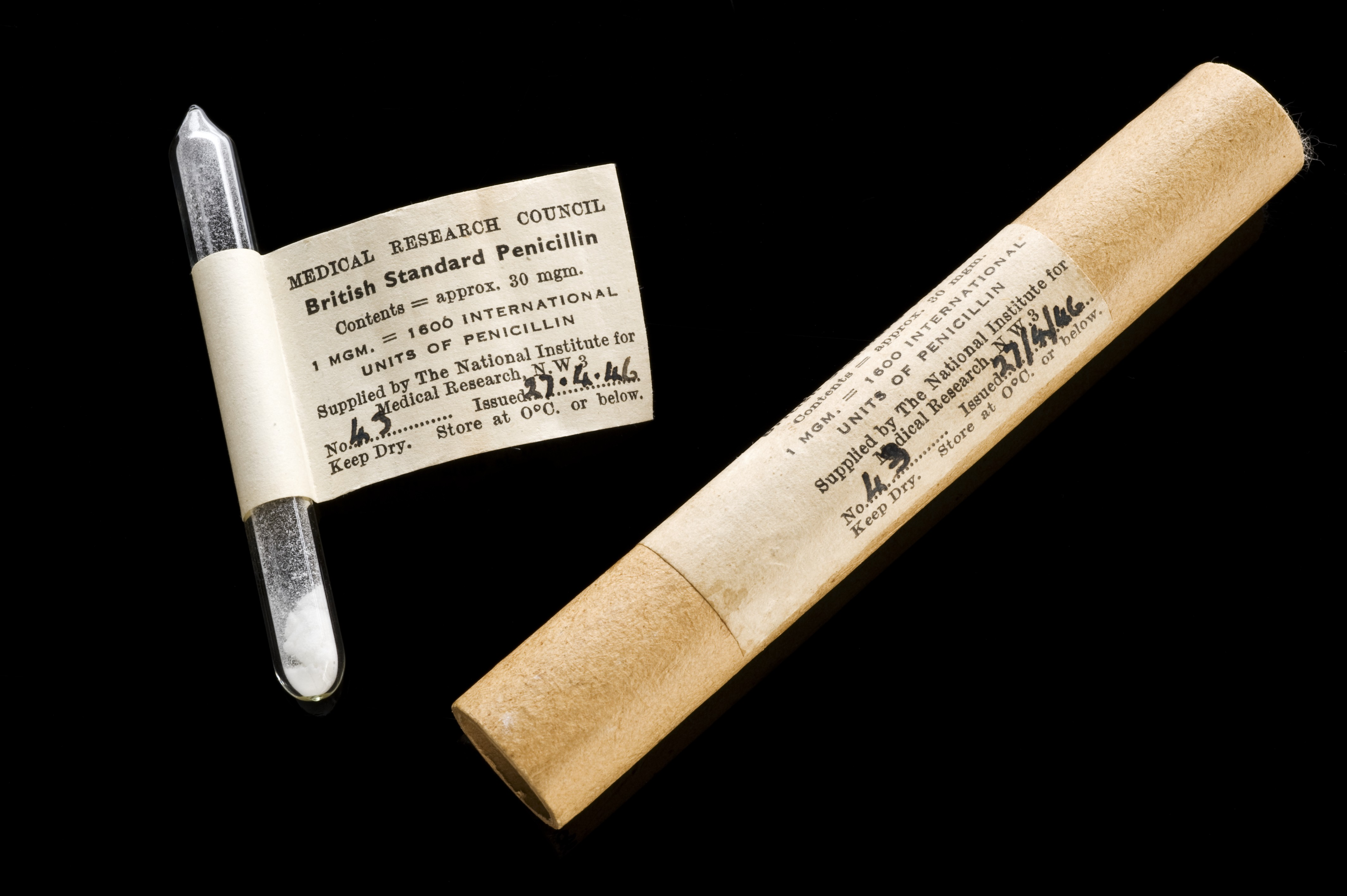
Glass vial of British Standard penicillin

The history of penicillin traces how observations of antibiotic activity in the mould Penicillium led to the development of penicillins, a family of widely used antibiotics.

Ancient societies used moulds to treat infections, and many people observed the inhibition of bacterial growth by moulds. While working at St Mary's Hospital in London in 1928, Scottish physician Alexander Fleming was the first to show experimentally that a Penicillium mould secretes an antibacterial substance, which he named "penicillin". The mould was found to be a variant of Penicillium chrysogenum (now called Penicillium rubens), a contaminant of a bacterial culture in his laboratory. The work on penicillin at St Mary's ended in 1929.

In 1939, a team of scientists at the Sir William Dunn School of Pathology at the University of Oxford, led by Howard Florey, which included Edward Abraham, Ernst Chain, Mary Ethel Florey, Norman Heatley and Margaret Jennings, began researching penicillin. They developed a method for cultivating the mould and extracting, purifying and storing penicillin from it, together with an assay for measuring its purity. "Penicillin" now became the name of the active ingredient in the mould juice. They carried out experiments on animals to determine penicillin's safety and effectiveness before conducting clinical trials and field tests. They derived penicillin's chemical formula and determined how it works. The private sector and the United States Department of Agriculture located and produced new strains and developed mass production techniques. During the Second World War penicillin became an important part of the Allied war effort, saving thousands of lives. Alexander Fleming, Howard Florey and Ernst Chain shared the 1945 Nobel Prize in Physiology or Medicine for the discovery and development of penicillin.

After the end of the war in 1945, penicillin became widely available. Dorothy Hodgkin determined its chemical structure, one of the achievements for which she received the Nobel Prize in Chemistry in 1964. This led to the development of semisynthetic penicillins that were more potent and effective against a wider range of bacteria. The drug was synthesised in 1957, but cultivation of mould remains the primary means of production. It was discovered that adding penicillin to animal feed increased weight gain, improved feed-conversion efficiency, promoted more uniform growth and facilitated disease control. Agriculture became a major user of penicillin. Shortly after their discovery of penicillin, the Oxford team reported penicillin resistance in many bacteria. Research that aims to circumvent and understand the mechanisms of antibiotic resistance continues.

== Early evidence ==
Many ancient cultures, including those in Australia, China, Egypt, Greece and India, independently discovered the useful properties of fungi and plants in treating infections. These treatments often worked because many organisms, including many species of mould, naturally produce antibiotics. However, ancient practitioners could not identify or isolate the active components in these organisms.

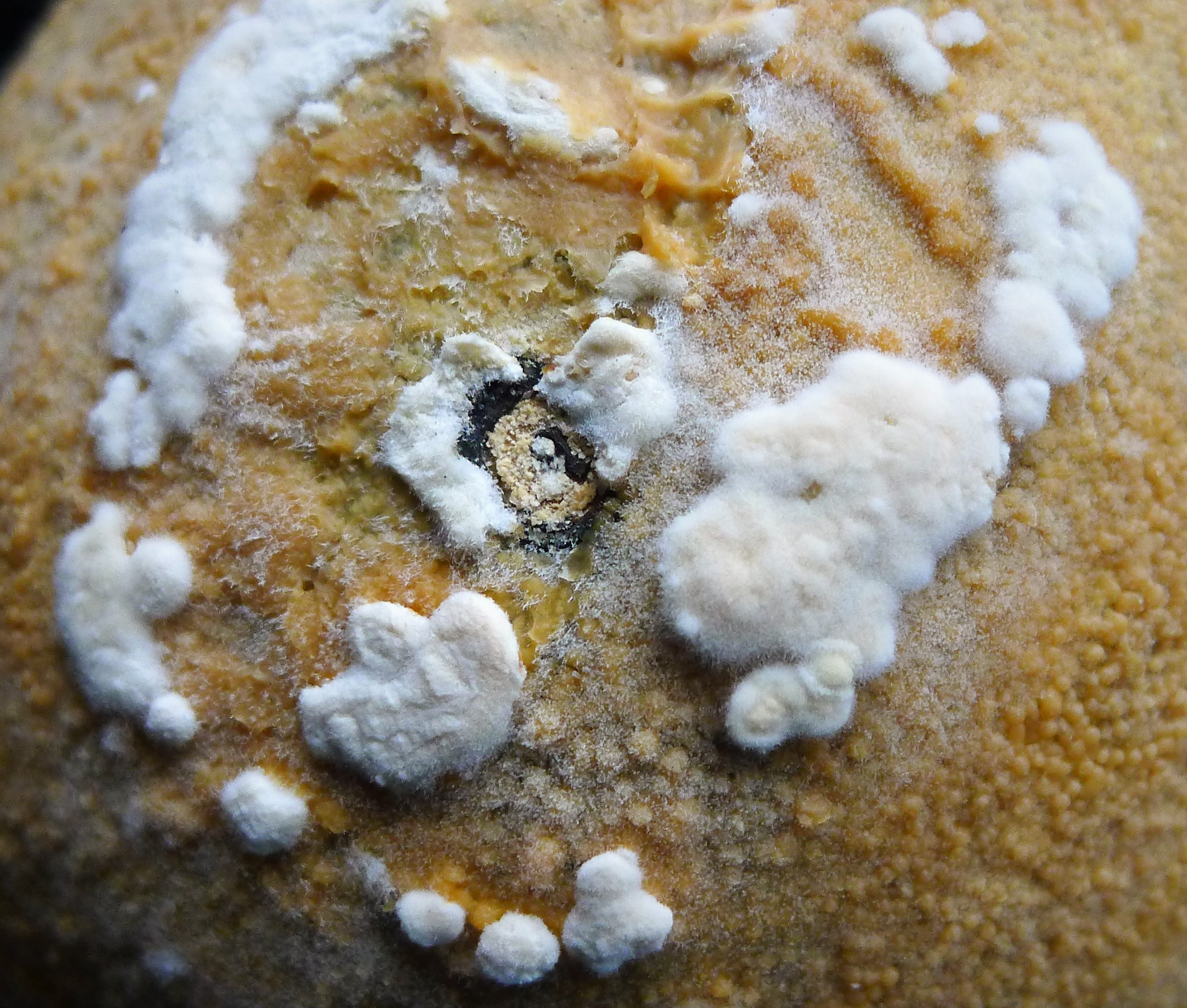
Penicillium mould on an orange

In 1895, Vincenzo Tiberio, an Italian physician at the University of Naples, published research on moulds initially found in a water well in Arzano; from his observations, he concluded that these moulds contained soluble substances having antibacterial action. A Pasteur Institute scientist, Costa Rican Clodomiro Picado Twight, similarly recorded the antibiotic effect of Penicillium in 1923. In these early stages of penicillin research, most species of Penicillium were non-specifically referred to as P. glaucum, so that it is impossible to know the exact species and that it was really penicillin that prevented bacterial growth.

André Gratia and Sara Dath at the Free University of Brussels studied the effects of bacterial samples on other bacteria. In 1924, they found that dead Staphylococcus aureus cultures were contaminated by a streptomycete. Upon further experimentation, they showed that an extract of the streptomycete could kill not only S. aureus, but also Pseudomonas aeruginosa, Mycobacterium tuberculosis and Escherichia coli (E. coli). Gratia called the antibacterial agent "mycolysate". The next year they found a killer mould that could inhibit B. anthracis. Reporting in Comptes rendus des séances de la Société de Biologie et de ses filiales, they identified the mould as Penicillium glaucum. These findings, however, received little attention as the antibacterial agent and its medical value were not fully understood, and Gratia's samples were lost.

== Discovery of the properties of mould juice ==
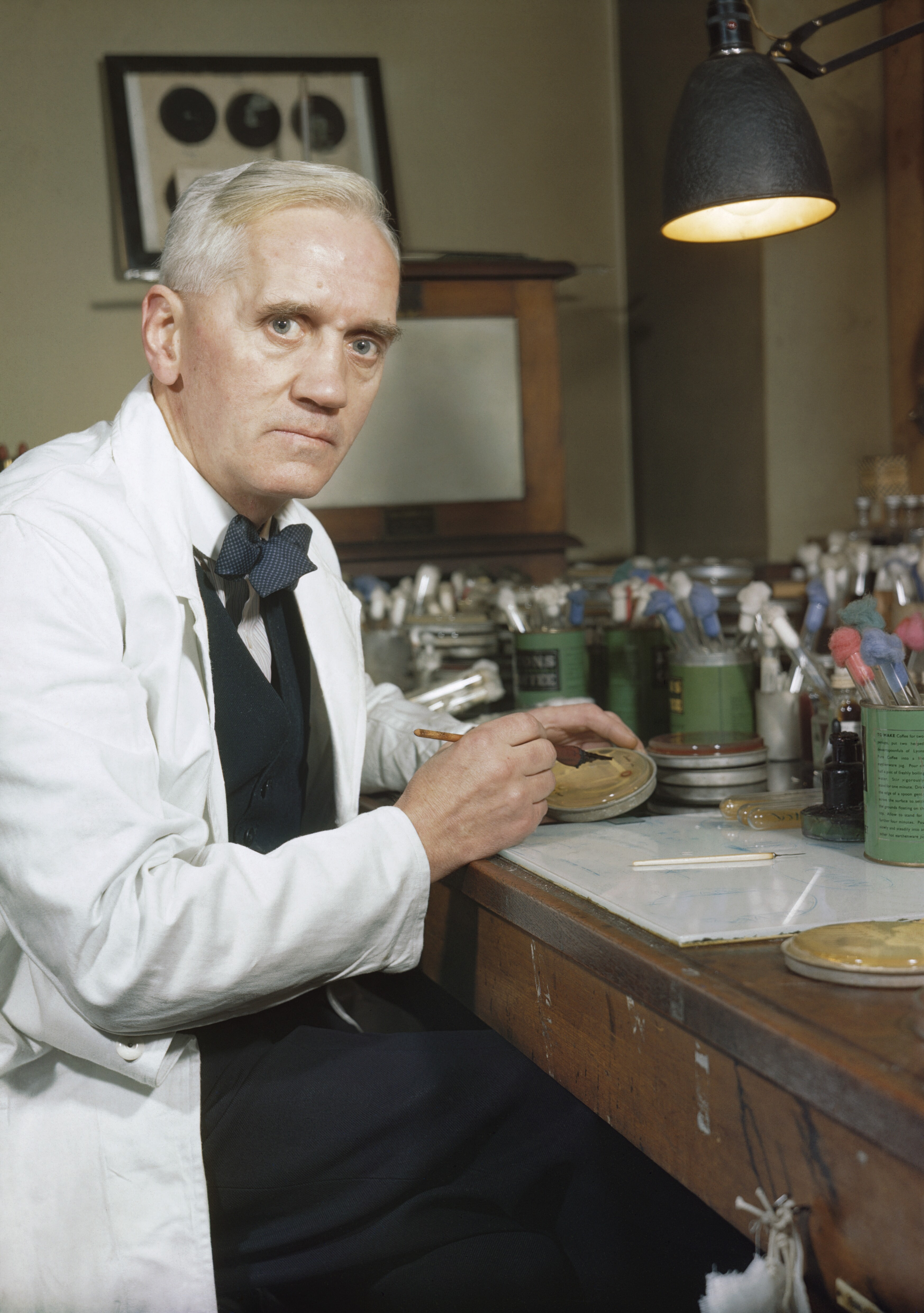
Alexander Fleming in his laboratory at St Mary's Hospital, London, in 1943

While working at St Mary's Hospital, London in 1928, Alexander Fleming, a Scottish physician, was investigating the variation of growth in cultures of S. aureus, trying to replicate research from Trinity College Dublin. He spent the summer break with his family at his country home The Dhoon at Barton Mills, Suffolk. Before leaving his laboratory at the end of July, he inoculated several culture plates with S. aureus. He kept the plates aside on one corner of the table away from direct sunlight and to make space for his research student, Stuart Craddock, to work in his absence. He returned to his laboratory on 3 September. As he and Daniel Merlin Pryce, his former research student, examined the culture plates, they found one with an open lid and the culture contaminated with a blue-green mould. In the contaminated plate the bacteria around the mould did not grow, while those farther away grew normally, meaning that the mould killed the bacteria. Fleming photographed the culture and took a sample of the mould for identification.

Fleming resumed his vacation and returned to St Mary's that month. He collected the original mould and grew it in culture plates. After four days he found that the plates developed large colonies of the mould. He repeated the experiment with the same bacteria-killing results. He concluded that the mould was releasing a substance that was inhibiting bacterial growth. On testing against different bacteria, he found that the mould could kill only certain Gram-positive bacteria. Staphylococcus, Streptococcus and diphtheria bacillus (Corynebacterium diphtheriae) were easily killed, but there was no effect on typhoid bacterium (Salmonella typhimurium) and the bacterium once thought to cause influenza (Haemophilus influenzae). He prepared a culture method from which he could obtain the mould juice, which he called "penicillin" on 7 March 1929, "to avoid the repetition of the rather cumbersome phrase 'mould broth filtrate'." In his Nobel lecture of 1945 he gave a further explanation, saying:

I have been frequently asked why I invented the name "Penicillin". I simply followed perfectly orthodox lines and coined a word which explained that the substance penicillin was derived from a plant of the genus Penicillium just as many years ago the word "Digitalin" was invented for a substance derived from the plant Digitalis.

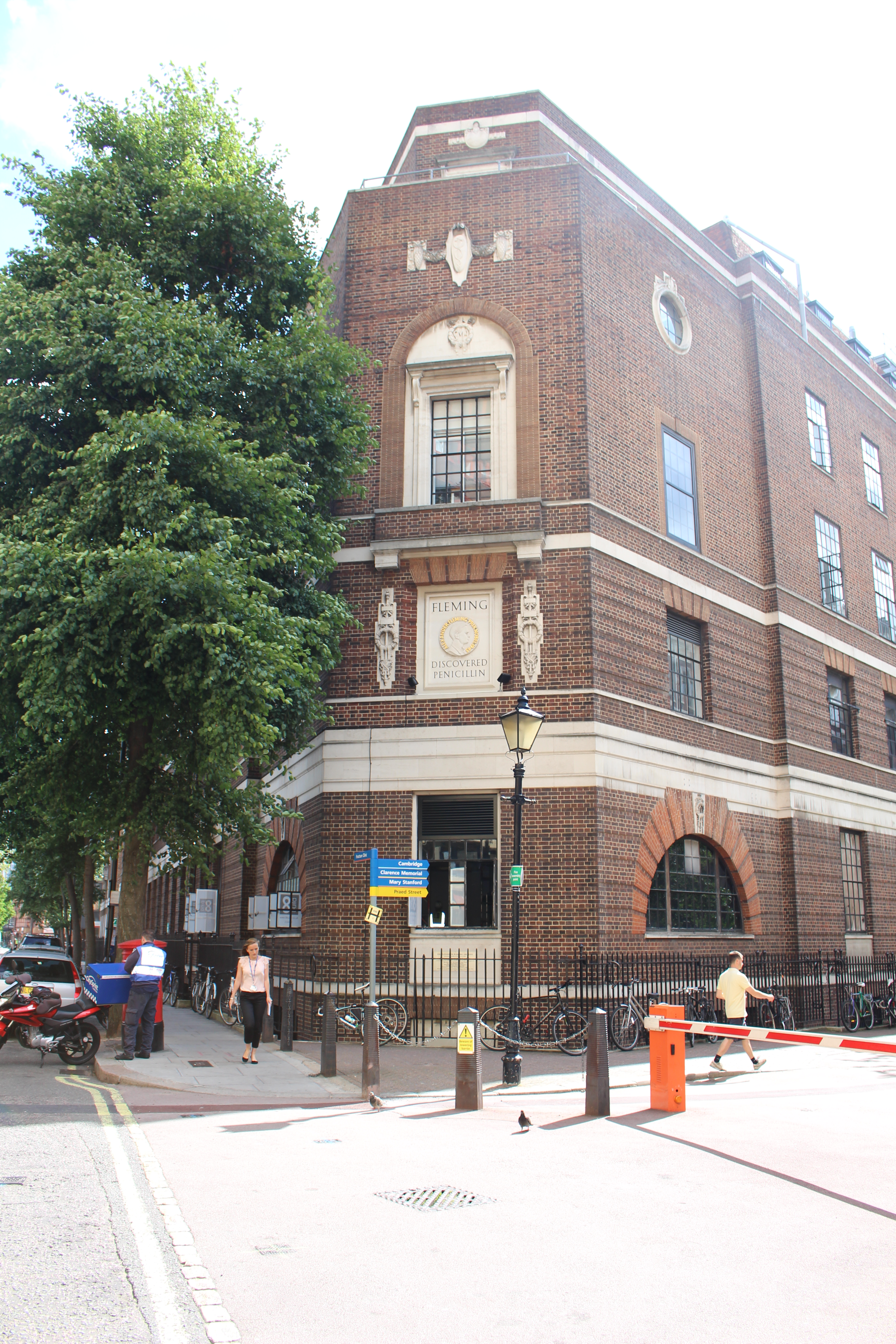
St Mary's Hospital showing Fleming's lab and Praed Street

After structural comparison with different species of Penicillium, Fleming believed that his specimen was Penicillium chrysogenum, a species described by an American microbiologist Charles Thom in 1910. Charles John Patrick La Touche, an Irish botanist, had recently joined St Mary's as a mycologist, and he identified the specimen as Penicillium rubrum, the identification used by Fleming in his publication. In 1931, Thom re-examined different Penicillia, including that of Fleming's specimen, and he came to the conclusion that Fleming's specimen was P. notatum, a member of the P. chrysogenum series. From then on, Fleming's mould was synonymously referred to as P. notatum and P. chrysogenum. To resolve the confusion, the Seventeenth International Botanical Congress held in Vienna, Austria, in 2005 formally adopted P. chrysogenum as the name. Whole-genome sequence and phylogenetic analysis in 2011 revealed that Fleming's mould belongs to P. rubens, a species described by Belgian microbiologist Philibert Biourge in 1923.

The source of the fungal contamination in Fleming's experiment remained the subject of speculation for several decades. Fleming suggested in 1945 that the fungal spores came through the window facing Praed Street, but was disputed by his co-workers, who testified much later that Fleming's laboratory window was kept shut, and Fleming was unable to reach the window to open it. A consensus developed that the mould had come from La Touche's laboratory, a floor below Fleming's, and that spores had drifted in through the open doors.

To achieve the antibacterial effect on the staphylococci cultures that Fleming observed, the mould had to be producing sufficient amounts of penicillin no later than when the bacterial growth was beginning to form visible colonies, because penicillin is only effective on bacteria when they are reproducing. Fortuitously, the temperature in the laboratory during that August was optimum first for the growth of the mould, below 20 °C, and later in the month for the bacteria, when it reached 25 °C.

Fleming was a bacteriologist, not a chemist, so he left most of the chemical work to Craddock. In January 1929, Fleming recruited Frederick Ridley, a former research student of his with a background in biochemistry, to examine the chemical properties of the mould. Craddock and Ridley could not isolate penicillin, and before the experiments were over, both had left for other jobs.

Fleming reported his findings to the British Journal of Experimental Pathology on 10 May 1929, and they were published in the next month's issue, but the article failed to attract much attention. Fleming was quite unsure of the medical application of his work and was more concerned with its application for bacterial isolation. The article also contained serious errors. Although Ridley and Craddock had demonstrated that penicillin was soluble in ether, acetone and alcohol as well as in water – information that would be critical to its isolation – Fleming erroneously claimed that it was soluble in alcohol and insoluble in ether and chloroform, which had not been tested. In fact, penicillin is soluble in ethanol, ether and chloroform. Further research was undertaken in the early 1930s by others including Harold Raistrick who confirmed the chemical instability of penicillin in 1932. While Fleming continued to send samples of the mould to researchers, the requests for samples tapered off.

== Isolation ==
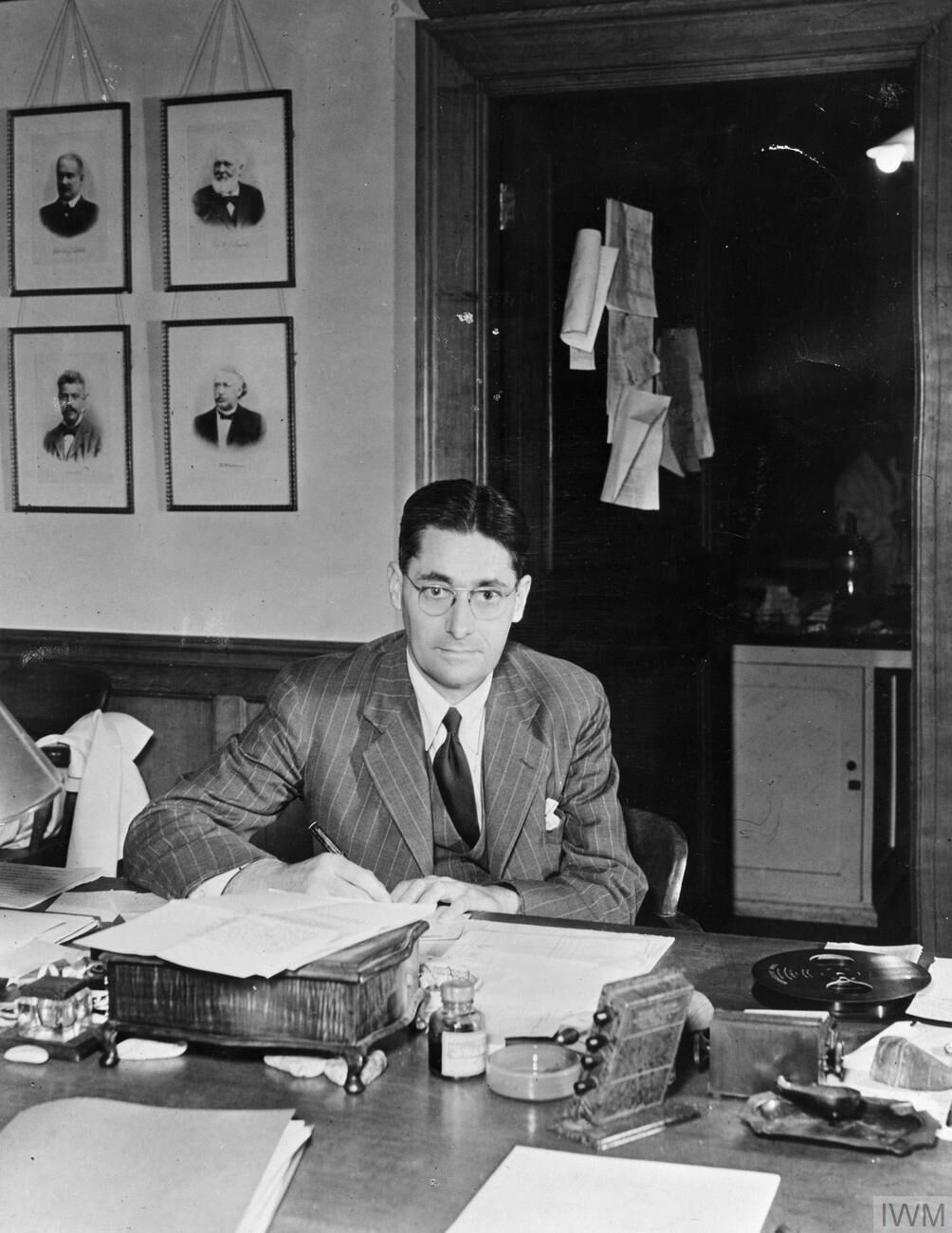
Howard Florey in his office in 1944

In 1939, at the Sir William Dunn School of Pathology at the University of Oxford, Ernst Boris Chain drew the attention of the professor in charge of the school, the Australian scientist Howard Florey, to Fleming's largely forgotten 1929 paper. They decided that the study of antibacterial substances produced by micro-organisms might be a fruitful avenue of research. Florey led an interdisciplinary research team that included Edward Abraham, Mary Ethel Florey, Arthur Duncan Gardner, Norman Heatley, Margaret Jennings, Jean Orr-Ewing and Gordon Sanders. Each member of the team tackled a particular aspect of the problem in their area of expertise, with simultaneous research along different lines building up a complete picture. This sort of collaboration was practically unknown in the United Kingdom at the time. Three sources were initially chosen for investigation: Bacillus subtilis, Trueperella pyogenes and penicillin. "[The possibility] that penicillin could have practical use in clinical medicine", Chain later recalled, "did not enter our minds when we started our work on penicillin."

The broad subject area was deliberately chosen as one requiring long-term funding. Florey approached the Medical Research Council (MRC) for support in September 1939. The secretary of the council, Edward Mellanby authorized the project, allocating £250 (equivalent to £14,000 in 2025) to launch the project, with £300 for salaries (equivalent to £17,000 in 2025) and £100 for expenses (equivalent to £6,000 in 2025) per annum for three years. "It seems to me", Mellanby wrote to Florey, "that the line of work you are suggesting will be interesting and may prove to be of practical importance."

Florey felt that far more would be required. On 1 November 1939, Henry M. "Dusty" Miller Jr from the Natural Sciences Division of the Rockefeller Foundation paid Florey a visit. Miller encouraged Florey to apply for funding from the foundation and supported his application. "The work proposed", Florey wrote in the application letter, "in addition to its theoretical importance, may have practical value for therapeutic purposes." His application was approved, with the foundation allocating US$5,000 (£1,250) per annum for five years.

The Oxford team's first task was to obtain a sample of penicillin mould. This turned out to be easy. Georges Dreyer, Florey's predecessor, had obtained a sample of the mould in 1930 for his work on bacteriophages, viruses that infect bacteria. Dreyer had lost interest in penicillin when he discovered that it was not a bacteriophage, but he had continued to cultivate it. Dreyer had died in 1934, but Campbell-Renton had continued to culture the mould and was able to supply it to the Oxford team. The next task was to grow sufficient mould to extract enough penicillin for laboratory experiments. The mould was cultured on a surface of liquid Czapek-Dox medium. Over the course of a few days it formed a yellow gelatinous skin covered in green spores. Beneath this, the liquid became yellow and contained penicillin. The team determined that the maximum yield was achieved in ten to twenty days.

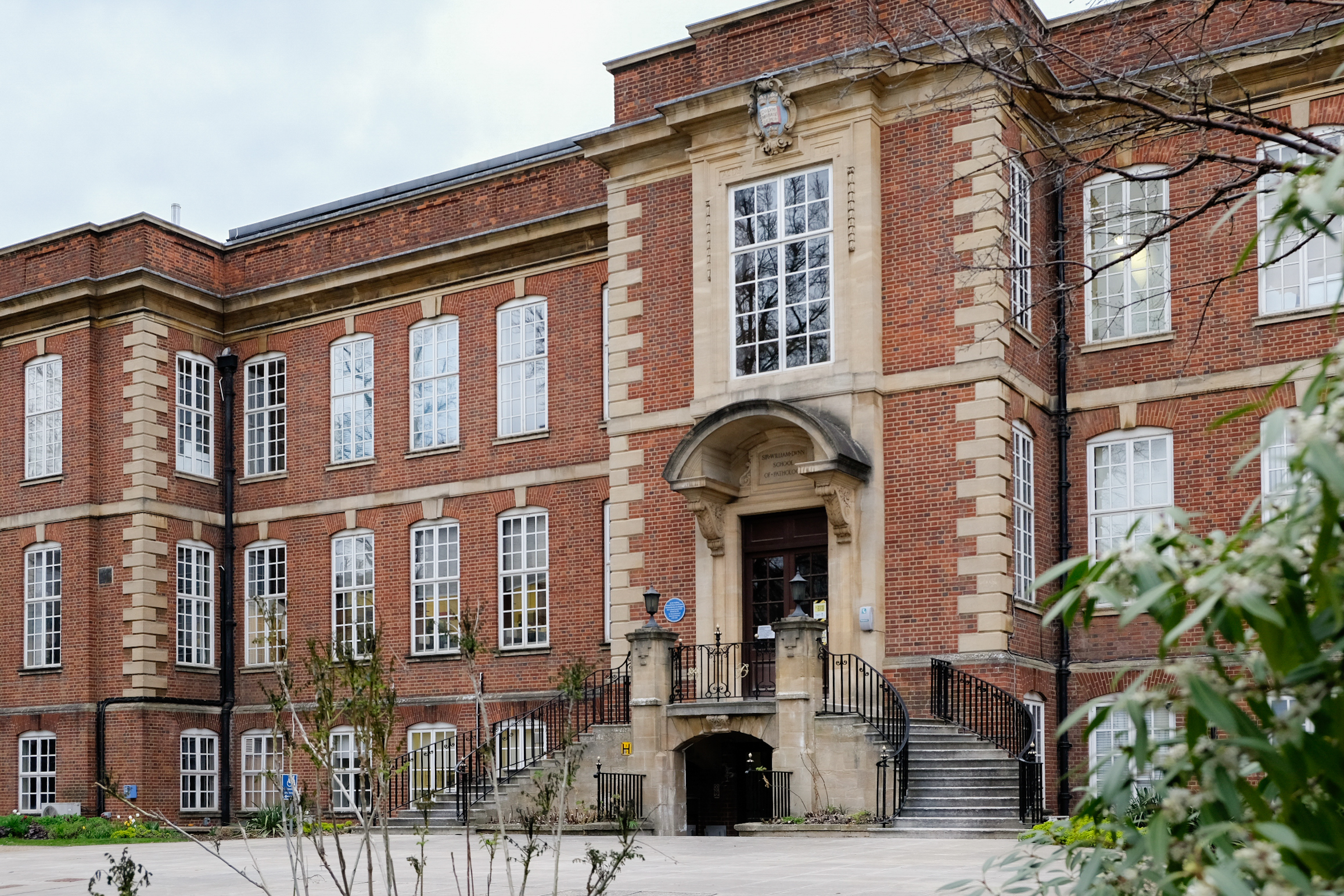
The Sir William Dunn School of Pathology in Oxford

The mould needs air to grow, so cultivation required a container with a large surface area. Initially, glass bottles laid on their sides were used. Most laboratory containers did not provide a large, flat area, and so were an uneconomical use of incubator space. The bedpan was found to be practical, and was the basis for specially-made ceramic containers fabricated by J. Macintyre and Company in Burslem. These containers were rectangular in shape and could be stacked to save space. The MRC agreed to Florey's request for £300 (equivalent to £15,000 in 2025) and £2 each per week (equivalent to £97 in 2025) for two women factory hands. In 1943 Florey asked for their wages to be increased to £2 10s each per week (equivalent to £99 in 2025). Heatley collected the first 174 of an order for 500 vessels on 22 December 1940, and they were seeded with spores three days later.

Efforts were made to coax the mould into producing more penicillin. Heatley tried adding various substances to the medium, including sugars, salts, malts, alcohol and even marmite, without success. At the suggestion of Paul Fildes, he tried adding brewing yeast. This did not improve the yield either, but it did cut the incubation time by a third. The team also discovered that if the penicillin-bearing fluid was removed and replaced by fresh fluid, a second batch of penicillin could be prepared, but this practice was discontinued after eighteen months due to the danger of contamination. The mould had to be grown under sterile conditions. Abraham and Chain discovered that some airborne bacteria produced penicillinase, an enzyme that destroys penicillin. It was not known why the mould produced penicillin, as the bacteria penicillin kills are no threat to the mould; it was conjectured that it was a byproduct of metabolic processes for other purposes.

The next stage of the process was to extract the penicillin. The liquid was filtered through parachute silk to remove the mycelium, spores and other solid debris. The solution was acidified by the addition of phosphoric acid for the dissociation process. Chain determined that penicillin was stable only with a pH of between 5 and 8, but the process required one lower than that. By keeping the mixture at 0 °C, he could retard the breakdown process. In this form the penicillin could be drawn off by a solvent. Initially ether was used, as it was the only solvent known to dissolve penicillin, but it is highly inflammable and toxic. At Chain's suggestion, they tried using the much less flammable amyl acetate instead, and found that it also worked.

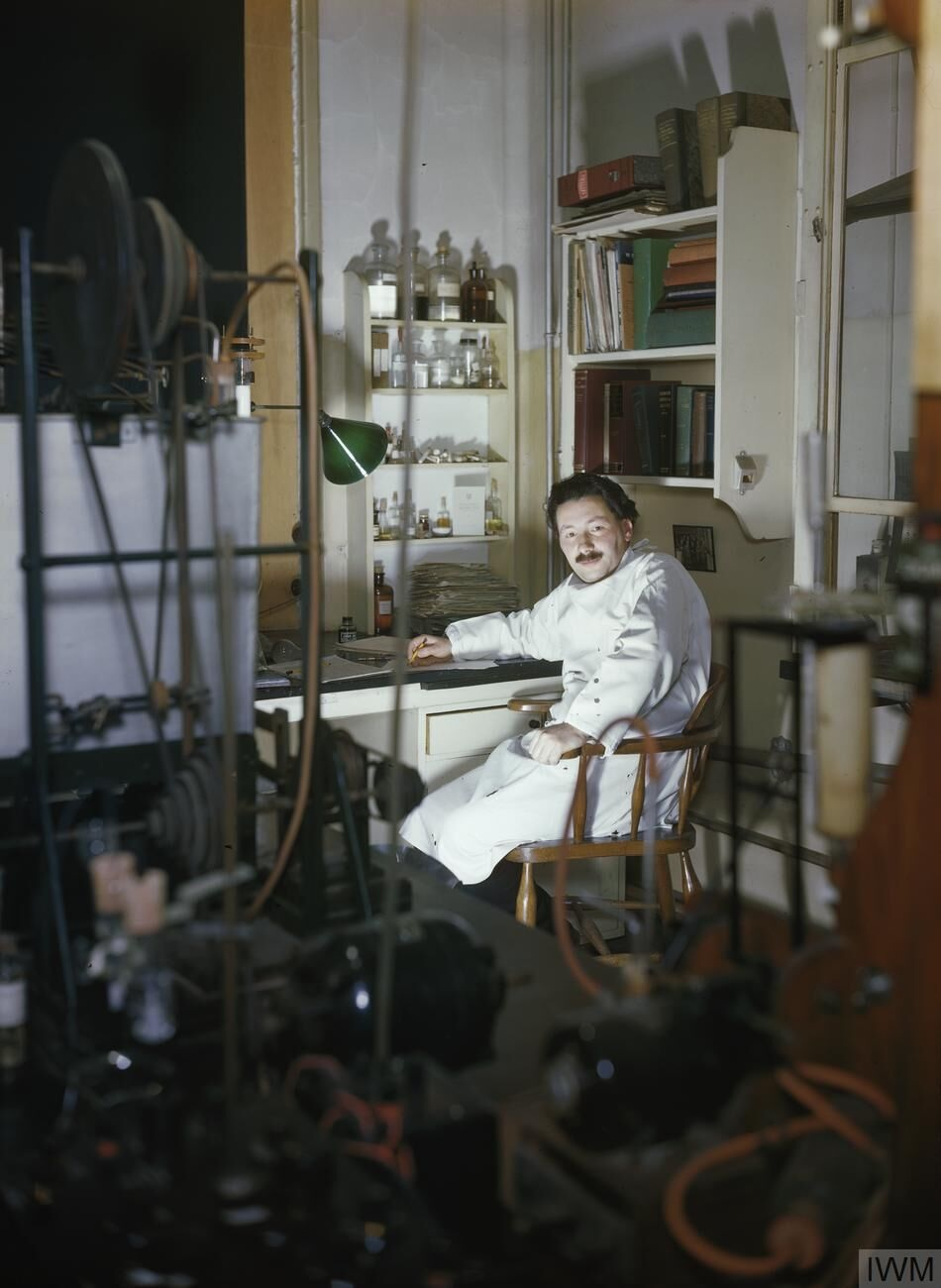
Ernst Chain in his laboratory

Heatley was able to develop a continuous extraction process. The penicillin-bearing solvent was easily separated from the liquid, as it floated on top, but now they encountered the problem that had stymied Craddock and Ridley: recovering the penicillin from the solvent. Heatley reasoned that if the penicillin could pass from water to solvent when the solution was acidic, maybe it would pass back again if the solution was alkaline. Florey told him to give it a try. Sodium hydroxide was added, and this method, which Heatley called "reverse extraction", was found to work. The next problem was how to extract the penicillin from the water. The usual means of extracting something from water were through evaporation or boiling, but this would destroy the penicillin. Chain hit upon the idea of freeze drying, a technique recently developed in Sweden. This enabled the water to be removed, resulting in a dry, brown powder.

Heatley developed a penicillin assay using agar nutrient plates in which bacteria were seeded. Short glass cylinders containing the penicillin-bearing fluid to be tested were then placed on the nutrient plates and incubated for 12 to 16 hours at 37 °C. By then the fluid would have disappeared and the cylinder surrounded by a bacteria-free ring. The diameter of the ring indicated the strength of the penicillin. An Oxford unit was defined as the purity required to produce a 25 mm bacteria-free ring. It was an arbitrary measurement, as the chemistry was not yet known; the first research was conducted with solutions containing four or five Oxford units per milligram. Later, when highly pure penicillin became available, it was found to have 2,000 Oxford units per milligram. Yet in testing the impure substance, they found it effective against bacteria even at concentrations of one part per million. Penicillin was at least twenty times as active as the most powerful sulfonamide. The Oxford unit turned out to be very small; treating a single case required about a million units.

The Oxford team reported details of the isolation method in August 1941, with a scheme for large-scale extraction. In March 1942, they reported that they could prepare a highly purified compound. In 1943 Edward Abraham proposed a structure for penicillin that contained a beta lactam ring. This structure was confirmed in 1945 by Dorothy Hodgkin, using X-ray crystallography.

== Trials ==
Howard Florey's team at Oxford showed that Penicillium extract killed many kinds of bacteria. Gardner and Orr-Ewing tested it against gonococcus (against which it was most effective), meningococcus, streptococcus, staphylococcus, Bacillus anthracis, actinomyces and tetanus bacterium (Clostridium tetani) and the bacteria that cause gangrene. They observed bacteria attempting to grow in the presence of penicillin, and noted that penicillin was neither an enzyme that broke the bacteria down, nor an antiseptic that killed them; rather, it was a chemical that interfered with the process of cell division. Jennings observed that it had no effect on white blood cells, and would therefore reinforce rather than hinder the body's natural defences against bacteria. She also found that unlike sulphonamides, the first and only effective broad-spectrum antibiotic available at the time, it was not destroyed by pus. Medawar found that it did not affect the growth of tissue cells.

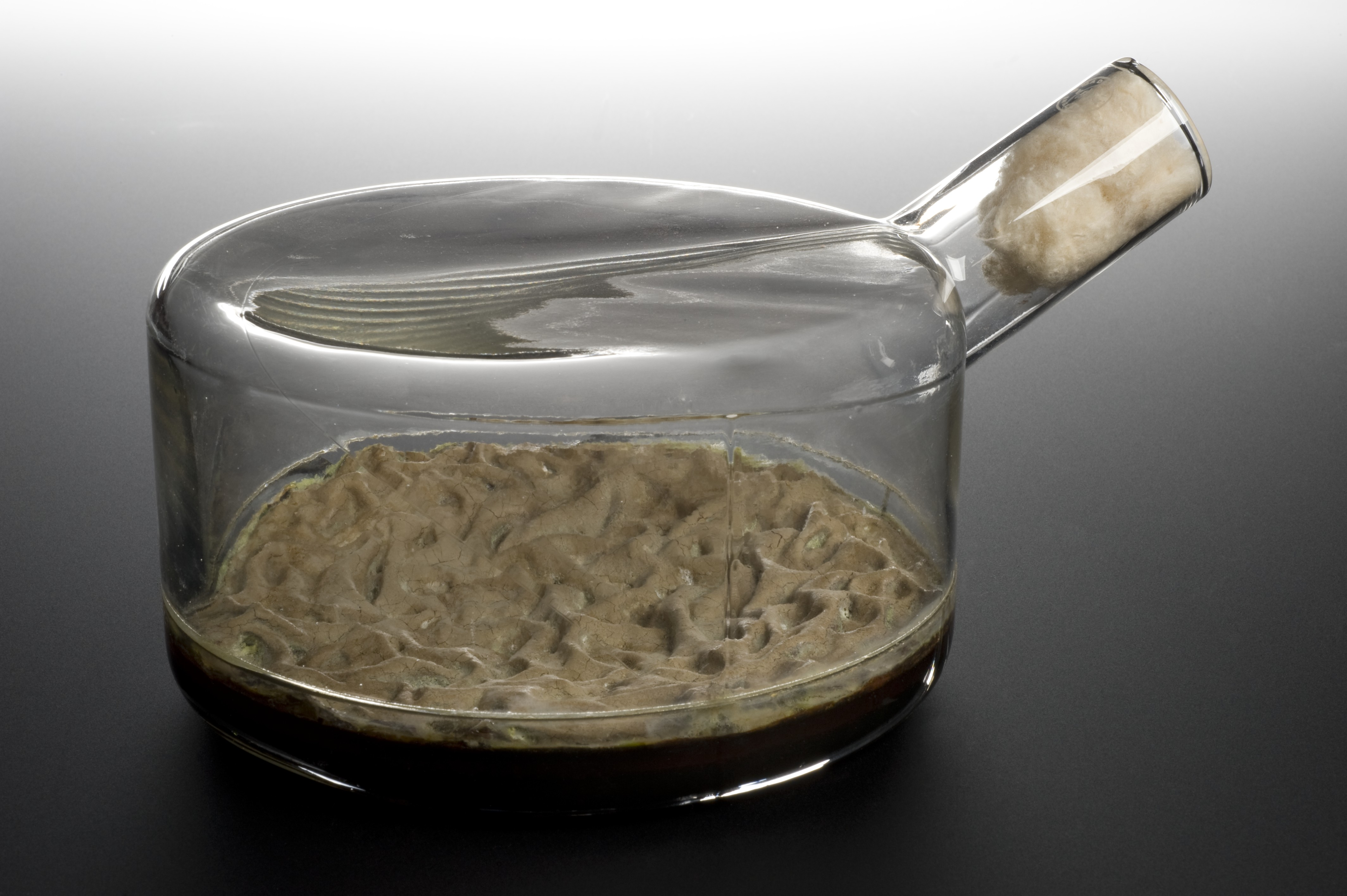
Thousands of glass fermentation vessels like this one were used in laboratories to produce penicillin. The mould was grown on the surface of a liquid filled with nutrients. The stopper kept contaminants out while allowing the mould to get fresh air.

By March 1940 the Oxford team had sufficient impure penicillin to commence testing whether it was toxic. Over the next two months, Florey and Jennings conducted a series of experiments on rats, mice, rabbits and cats in which penicillin was administered in various ways. Their results showed that penicillin was destroyed in the stomach, but that all forms of injection were effective, as indicated by assay of the blood. It was found that penicillin was largely and rapidly excreted unchanged in their urine. They found no evidence of toxicity in any of their animals. Had they tested against guinea pigs, research might have halted at this point, for penicillin is toxic to guinea pigs.

At 11:00 am on Saturday 25 May 1940, Florey injected eight mice with a virulent strain of Streptococcus, and then injected four of them with the penicillin solution. These four were divided into two groups: two of them received 10 milligrams once, and the other two received 5 milligrams at regular intervals. By 3:30 am on Sunday all four of the untreated mice were dead. All of the treated ones were still alive, although one died two days later. Florey described the result to Jennings as "a miracle."

Jennings and Florey repeated the experiment on Monday with ten mice; this time, all six of the treated mice survived, as did one of the four controls. On Tuesday, they repeated it with sixteen mice, administering different doses of penicillin. All six of the control mice died within 24 hours but the treated mice survived for several days, although they were all dead in nineteen days. On 1 July, the experiment was performed with fifty mice, half of whom received penicillin. All twenty-five of the control mice died within sixteen hours while all but one of the treated mice were alive ten days later. Over the following weeks they performed experiments with batches of 50 or 75 mice, but using different bacteria. They found that penicillin was also effective against staphylococci and gas gangrene. Florey reminded his staff that promising as their results were, a human being weighed 3,000 times as much as a mouse.

The Oxford team reported their results in the 24 August 1940 issue of The Lancet, a prestigious medical journal, as "Penicillin as a Chemotherapeutic Agent" with names of the seven joint authors listed alphabetically. They concluded:

The results are clear cut, and show that penicillin is active in vivo against at least three of the organisms inhibited in vitro. It would seem a reasonable hope that all organisms in high dilution in vitro will be found to be dealt with in vivo. Penicillin does not appear to be related to any chemotherapeutic substance at present in use and is particularly remarkable for its activity against the anaerobic organisms associated with gas gangrene.

The publication attracted little attention; Florey would spend much of the next two years attempting to convince people of the significance of their results. One reader was Fleming, who paid them a visit on 2 September 1940. Florey and Chain gave him a tour of the production, extraction and testing laboratories, but he made no comment and did not congratulate them on the work they had done. Some members of the Oxford team suspected that he was trying to claim some credit for it.

Unbeknown to the Oxford team, their Lancet article was read by Martin Henry Dawson, Gladys Hobby and Karl Meyer at Columbia University, and they were inspired to replicate the Oxford team's results. They obtained a culture of Penicillium mould from Roger Reid at Johns Hopkins Hospital, grown from a sample he had received from Fleming in 1935. They began growing the mould on 23 September, and on 30 September tested it against viridans streptococci, and confirmed the Oxford team's results. Meyer duplicated Chain's processes, and they obtained a small quantity of penicillin. On 15 October 1940, doses of penicillin were administered to two patients with bacterial endocarditis at the Presbyterian Hospital in New York City, Aaron Alston and Charles Aronson. They became the first persons to receive penicillin treatment in the United States. The Columbia team presented the results of their penicillin treatment of the four patients at the annual meeting of the American Society for Clinical Investigation in Atlantic City, New Jersey, on 5 May 1941. Their paper was reported on by William L. Laurence in The New York Times and generated great public interest.

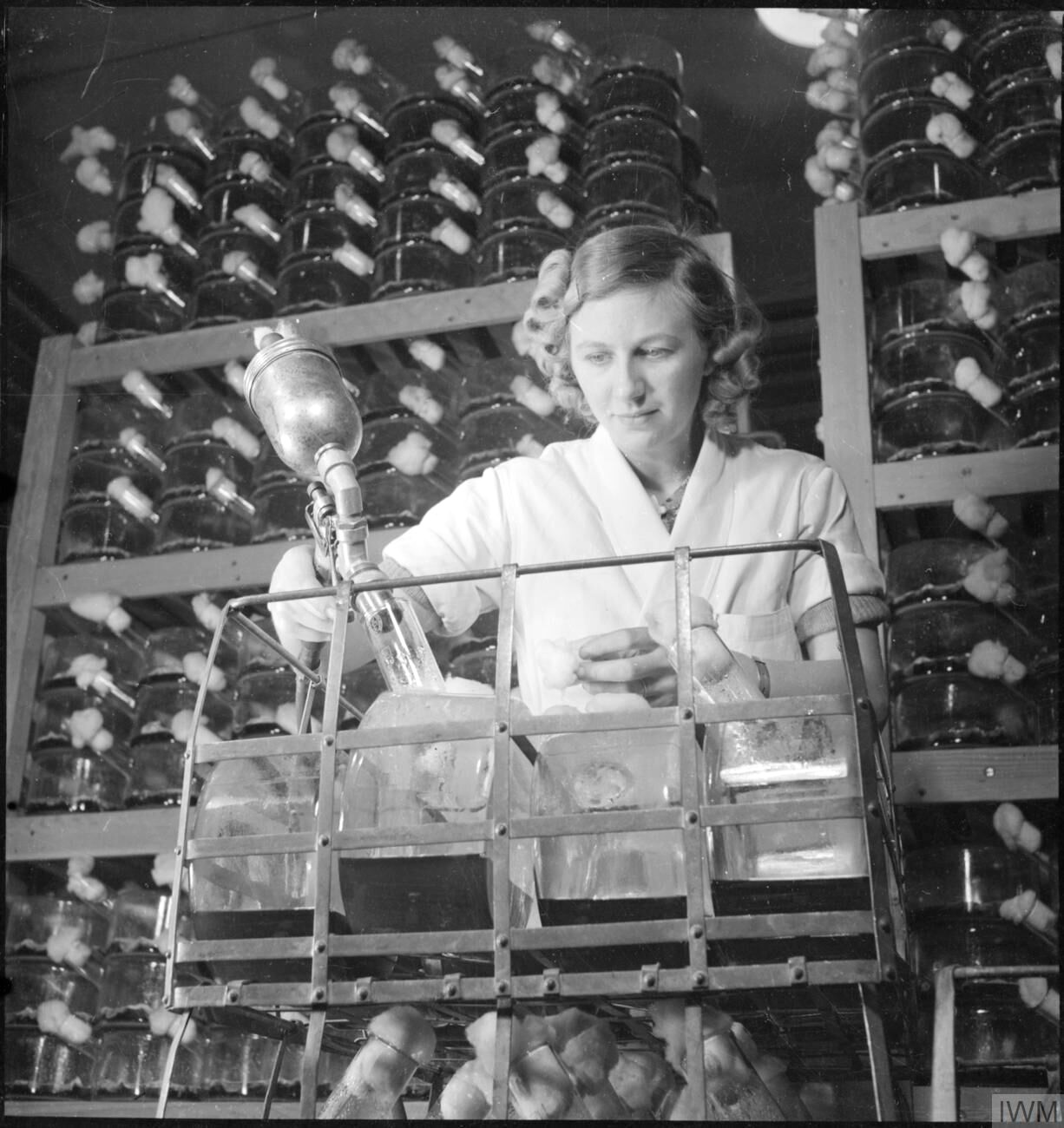
A laboratory worker sprays a solution containing penicillin mould into flasks of corn steep liquor medium, to encourage further penicillin growth.

At Oxford, Charles Fletcher volunteered to find test cases for human trials. Elva Akers, an Oxford woman dying from incurable cancer, agreed to be a test subject for the toxicity of penicillin. On 17 January 1941, he intravenously injected her with 100 mg of penicillin. Her temperature briefly rose, but otherwise she had no ill-effects. Florey reckoned that the fever was caused by pyrogens in the penicillin; these were removed with improved chromatography. Fletcher next identified an Oxford policeman, Albert Alexander, who had a severe facial infection involving streptococci and staphylococci which had developed from a small sore at the corner of his mouth. His whole face, eyes and scalp were swollen to the extent that he had an eye removed to relieve the pain.

On 12 February, Fletcher administered 200 mg of penicillin, following by 100 mg doses every three hours. Within a day of being given penicillin, Alexander started to recover; his temperature dropped and discharge from his suppurating wounds declined. By 17 February, his right eye had become normal. However, the researchers did not have enough penicillin to help him to a full recovery. Penicillin was recovered from his urine, but it was not enough. In early March he relapsed, and he died on 15 March. Because of this experience and the difficulty in producing penicillin, Florey changed the focus to treating children, who could be treated with smaller quantities of penicillin.

Subsequently, several patients were treated successfully. The second was Arthur Jones, a 15-year-old boy with a streptococcal infection from a hip operation. He was given 100 mg every three hours for five days and recovered. Percy Hawkin, a 42-year-old labourer, had a 100-millimetre (4 in) carbuncle on his back. He was given an initial 200 mg on 3 May followed by 100 mg every hour. The carbuncle completely disappeared. John Cox, a semi-comatose 4-year-old boy was treated starting on 16 May. He died on 31 May but the post-mortem indicated this was from a ruptured artery in the brain, and there was no sign of infection. The fifth case, on 16 June, was a 14-year-old boy with an infection from a hip operation who made a full recovery.

In addition to increased production at the Dunn School, commercial production from a pilot plant established by Imperial Chemical Industries became available in January 1942, and Kembel, Bishop and Company delivered its first batch of 910 litres (200 imp gal) on 11 September. Florey decided that the time was ripe to conduct a second series of clinical trials. Ethel Florey was placed in charge, but while Howard Florey was a consulting pathologist at Oxford hospitals, and therefore entitled to use their wards and services, Ethel, to his annoyance, was accredited merely as his assistant. Doctors tended to refer patients to the trial who were in desperate circumstances rather than the most suitable, but when penicillin did succeed, confidence in its efficacy rose.

Ethel and Howard Florey published the results of clinical trials of penicillin in The Lancet on 27 March 1943, reporting the treatment of 187 cases of sepsis with penicillin. It was upon this medical evidence that the British War Cabinet set up the Penicillin Committee on 5 April 1943. The committee consisted of Cecil Weir, Director General of Equipment, as chairman; Alexander Fleming; Howard Florey; V. D. Allison, another one of Fleming's former research students; Sir Percival Hartley, the head of the MRC; and representatives from pharmaceutical companies. This led to the mass production of penicillin by the next year.

== Developing industrial production ==
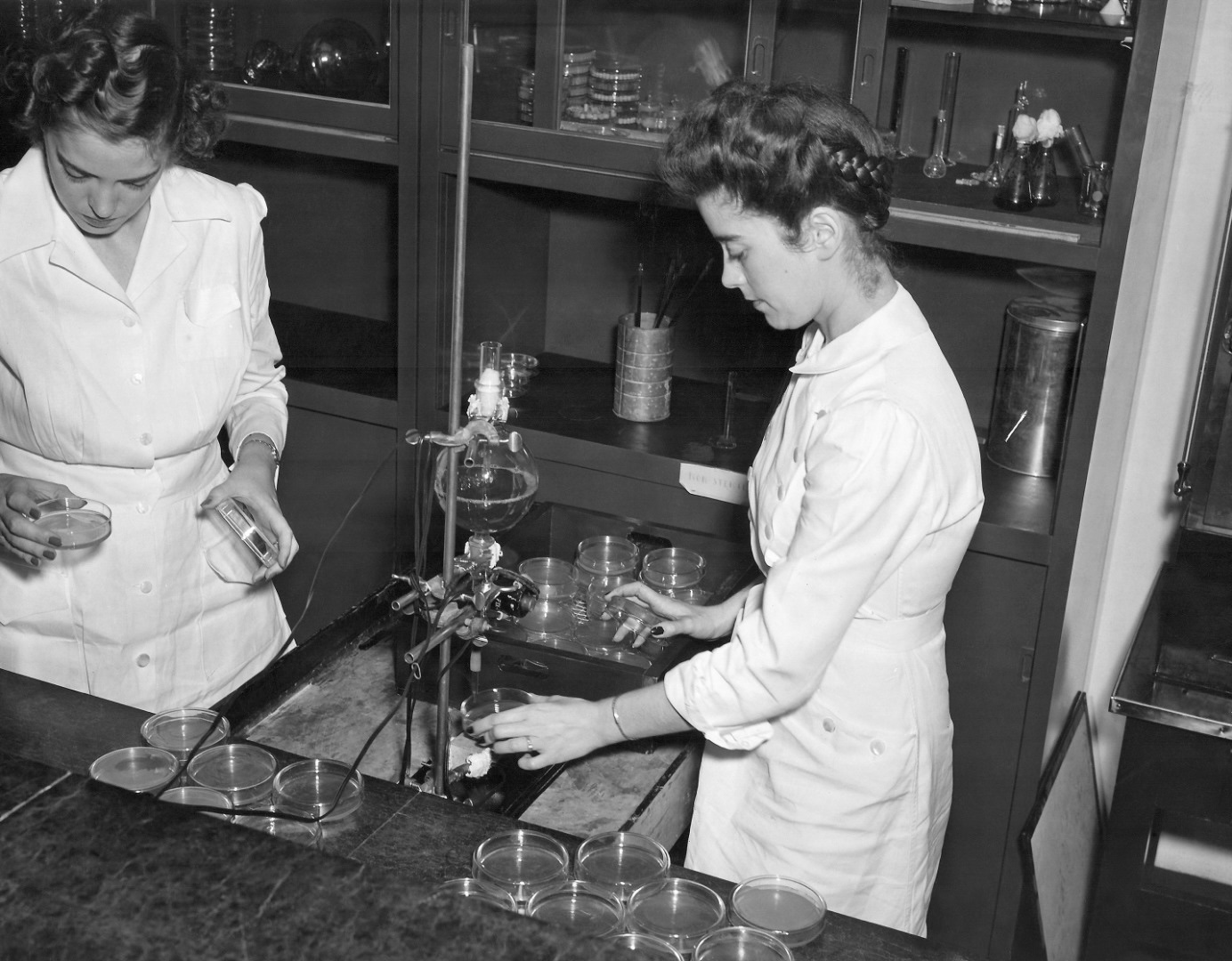
Mary Hunt, believed to be on the left, with a fellow worker inside the USDA Northern Regional Research Laboratory, c. 1943

Knowing that large-scale production for medical use was futile in a laboratory, the Oxford team tried to convince the war-torn British government and private companies to engage in mass production, but the initial response was muted. Dr Blount, director of research at Glaxo Laboratories, wrote to Florey at Oxford in September 1940 but received no reply. It appeared that Florey had already appealed for assistance to two British pharmaceutical companies but had been turned down by them, and had become disillusioned with the British pharmaceutical industry.

In April 1941, Warren Weaver met with Florey, and they discussed the difficulty of producing sufficient penicillin to conduct clinical trials. Weaver arranged for the Rockefeller Foundation to fund a three-month visit to the United States for Florey and a colleague to explore the possibility of production of penicillin there. Florey and Heatley left for the United States by air on 27 June 1941. Knowing that mould samples kept in vials could be easily lost, they smeared their coat pockets with the mould.

Florey met with neurophysiologist John Fulton, who introduced him to Ross Harrison, the Chairman of the National Research Council (NRC). Harrison referred Florey to Thom, the chief mycologist at the Bureau of Plant Industry of the United States Department of Agriculture (USDA) in Beltsville, Maryland, and the man who had identified the mould reported by Fleming. On 9 July, Thom took Florey and Heatley to Washington, D.C., to meet Percy Wells, the acting assistant chief of the USDA Bureau of Agricultural and Industrial Chemistry and as such the head of the USDA's four laboratories. Wells sent an introductory telegram to Orville May, the director of the UDSA's Northern Regional Research Laboratory (NRRL) in Peoria, Illinois. They met with May on 14 July, and he arranged for them to meet Robert D. Coghill, the chief of the NRRL's fermentation division, who raised the possibility that fermentation in large vessels might be the key to large-scale production.

On 17 August, Florey met with Alfred Newton Richards, the chairman of the Committee for Medical Research (CMR) of the Office of Scientific Research and Development (OSRD), who promised his support. On 8 October, Richards held a meeting with representatives of four major pharmaceutical companies: Squibb, Merck, Pfizer and Lederle. Vannevar Bush, the director of OSRD was present, as was Thom, who represented the NRRL. Richards told them that antitrust laws would be suspended, allowing them to share information about penicillin. This was not legalized until 7 December 1943, and it covered only penicillin and no other drug. OSRD arranged with the War Production Board (WPB) for them to have priority for equipment for laboratories and pilot plants.

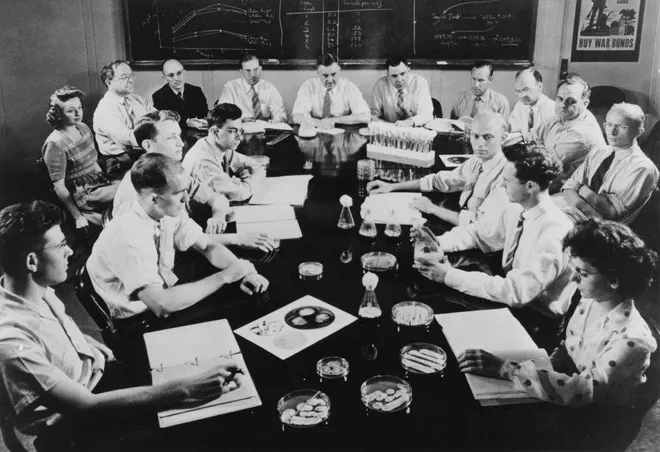
The USDA's penicillin research team. Back row, left to right: Dorothy Fennell Alexander, H. T. Herrick, F. H. Stodola, Kenneth B. Raper, Robert Coghill, George Ward and Andrew J. Moyer

Coghill made Andrew J. Moyer available to work on penicillin with Heatley, while Florey left to see if he could arrange for a pharmaceutical company to manufacture penicillin. As a first step to increasing yield, Moyer replaced sucrose in the growth media with lactose. An even larger increase occurred when Moyer added corn steep liquor, a byproduct of the corn industry that the NRRL routinely tried in the hope of finding more uses for it. The effect on penicillin was dramatic; Heatley and Moyer found that it increased the yield tenfold.

At the Yale New Haven Hospital in March 1942, Anne Sheafe Miller, the wife of Yale University's athletics director, Ogden D. Miller, was succumbing to a streptococcal septicaemia contracted after a miscarriage. Her doctor, John Bumstead, was also treating John Fulton for an infection at the time. He knew that Fulton knew Florey, and that Florey's children were staying with him. He went to Fulton to plead for some penicillin. Florey had returned to the UK, but Heatley was still in the United States, working with Merck. A phone call to Richards released 5.5 grams of penicillin earmarked for a clinical trial, which was despatched from Washington, D. C., by air. The effect was dramatic; within 48 hours her 41 °C (106 °F) fever had abated and she was eating again. Her blood culture count had dropped from 100 to 150 bacteria colonies per millilitre to just one. Bumstead suggested reducing the penicillin dose from 200 milligrams; Heatley warned him not to. Heatley subsequently came to New Haven, where he collected her urine; about 3 grams of penicillin were recovered. Miller made a full recovery, and lived until 1999.

=== Deep submergence ===
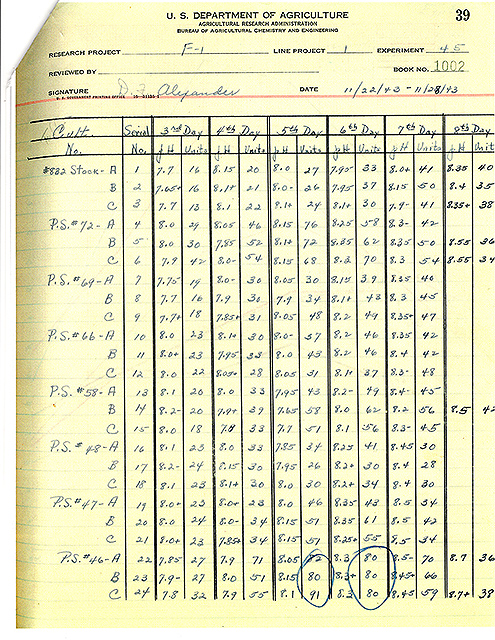
A notebook page signed by Dorothy Fennell Alexander. The circled strain, PS46 (later known as NRRL 1951), was the top performer.

Until May 1943, almost all penicillin was produced using the shallow-pan method pioneered by the Oxford team, but NRRL mycologist Kenneth Bryan Raper experimented with deep submergence production, in which penicillin mould was grown in a vat instead of a shallow dish. The initial results were disappointing; penicillin cultured in this manner yielded only three to four Oxford units per cubic centimetre, compared to twenty for surface cultures. He got the help of U.S. Army's Air Transport Command to search for similar mould in different parts of the world. Good moulds were found in samples from Chongqing, Bombay and Cape Town. The best sample, however, was from a cantaloupe sold in a Peoria fruit market in 1943. The mould was identified as Penicillium chrysogenum and designated as "NRRL 1951" or "cantaloupe strain". The spores may have escaped from the NRRL. (Note: On 17 August 2021, Illinois Governor J. B. Pritzker signed a bill designating it as the official State Microbe of Illinois.) (Note: There is a popular story that Mary K. Hunt (or Mary Hunt Stevens), a staff member of Raper's, collected the mould; for which she had been popularised as "Mouldy Mary". But Raper considered this story was a "folklore" and that the fruit was delivered to the lab by a woman from the Peoria fruit market.)

Between 1941 and 1943, Moyer, Coghill and Raper developed methods for industrialized penicillin production and isolated higher-yielding strains of the Penicillium fungus. To improve upon that strain, researchers at the Carnegie Institution of Washington subjected NRRL 1951 to X-rays to produce a mutant strain designated X-1612 that produced 300 milligrams of penicillin per litre of mould culture, twice as much as NRRL 1951. In turn, researchers at the University of Wisconsin used ultraviolet radiation on X-1612 to produce a strain designated Q-176. This produced more than twice the penicillin of X-1612, but in the form of the less desirable penicillin K. (Note: See § Chemical analysis for the different forms of penicillin.) Phenylacetic acid was added to switch it to producing the highly potent penicillin G. This strain could produce up to 550 milligrams of penicillin per litre.

Pfizer was a small New York company that specialised in making citric acid, for which it had developed deep submergence techniques. This involved converting molasses to citric acid by fermenting it in a large tank in which it was stirred and the pH was carefully controlled. Pfizer's vice president, John L. Smith, whose daughter had died from an infection, put all of Pfizer's resources into the development of a practical deep submergence technique. The company invested $2.98 million in penicillin in 1943 and 1944 (equivalent to $55 million in 2025). Pfizer scientists Jasper H. Kane, G. M. Shull, E. M. Weber, A. C. Finlay and E. J. Ratajak worked on the fermentation process while R. Pasternak, W. J. Smith, V. Bogert and P. Regna developed extraction techniques.

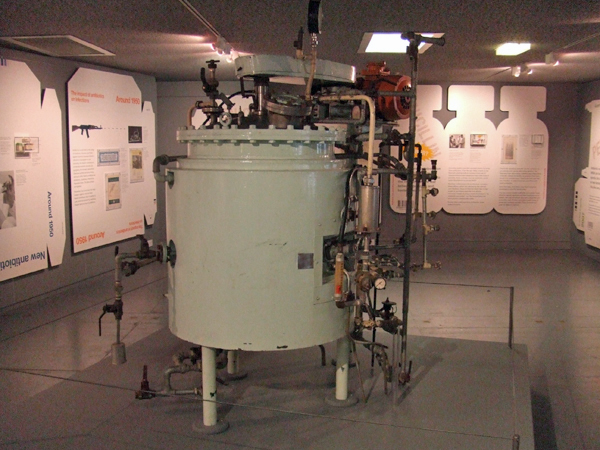
A 1957 fermentor in the Science Museum, London, once used to grow Penicillium mould

Now that they had a mould that grew well submerged and produced an acceptable amount of penicillin, the next challenge was to provide the required air to the mould for it to grow. This was solved using an aerator, but aeration caused severe foaming of the corn steep. The foaming problem was solved by the introduction of an anti-foaming agent, glyceryl monoricinoleate. The technique also involved cooling and mixing.

Pfizer opened a pilot plant with a 7,600-litre (2,000 US gal) fermentor in August 1943 and Ratajak delivered the first penicillin liquor from it on 27 August. The one tank was soon producing half the company's output. Smith then decided to construct a full-scale production plant. The nearby Rubel Ice plant was acquired on 20 September 1943 and converted into the first deep-submergence production plant, with fourteen 130,000-litre (34,000 US gal) tanks. The work was carried out in five months under the leadership of John E. McKeen and Edward J. Goett, and the plant opened on 1 March 1944.

== Worldwide production ==
=== Australia ===
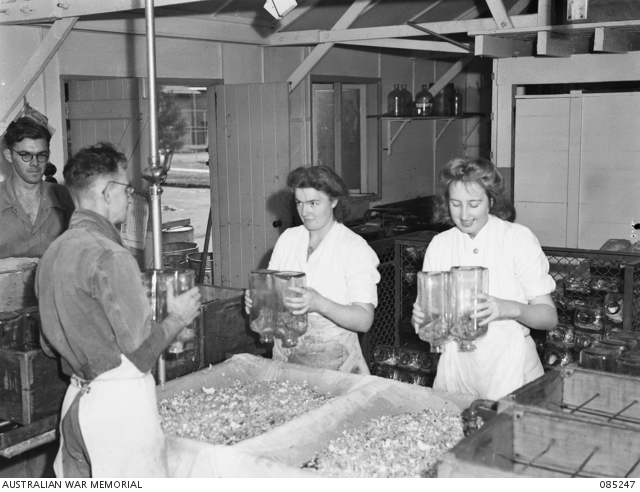
Mould being strained at the harvest table during the manufacture of penicillin at the Commonwealth Serum Laboratories in Parkville, Victoria.

In mid-1943 the Australian War Cabinet decided to produce penicillin in Australia. Colonel E. V. Keogh, the Australian Army's Director of Hygiene and Pathology, was placed in charge of the effort. Keogh summoned Captain Percival Bazeley, with whom he had worked at the Commonwealth Serum Laboratories (CSL) before the war, and Lieutenant H. H. Kretchmar, a chemist, and directed them to establish a production facility by Christmas. They set off on a fact-finding mission to the United States, where they visited NRRL and obtained penicillin cultures from Coghill. They also inspected the Pfizer plant in New York and the Merck plant at Rahway, New Jersey. A production plant was established at the CSL facilities in Parkville, Victoria, and the first Australian-made penicillin began reaching the troops in New Guinea in December 1943. By 1944, CSL was producing 400 million Oxford units per week (enough for 400 treatments), and there was sufficient penicillin production to allocate some for civilian use.

Wartime production in Australia was in bottles and flasks, but Bazeley made a second tour of facilities in the United States between September 1944 and March 1945 and was impressed by the progress made on deep submergence technology. In 1946 and 1947 he created a pilot deep submerged plant at CSL using small 45-litre (10 imp gal) tanks to gain experience with the technique. Two 23,000-litre (5,000 imp gal) tanks became operational in 1948, followed by eight more, giving CSL a capacity of 230,000 litres (50,000 imp gal) . During the 1950s and 1960s, CSL produced semisynthetic penicillin as well. Penicillin was also produced by F.H. Faulding in South Australia, Abbott Laboratories in New South Wales and Glaxo in Victoria. By the 1970s there was a worldwide glut of penicillin. Glaxo ceased production in 1975 followed by CSL in 1980.

=== Canada ===
During his visit to North America in August 1941, Howard Florey approached the Connaught Laboratories at the University of Toronto, where he met with the director, R. D. Defries, and Ronald Hare. Florey was rebuffed; Defries argued that the laboratories did not have the space, and he expressed his belief that constructing facilities to culture penicillin would be a waste as it would soon be synthesised. The results of clinical trials caused a change of heart, and in August 1943 the Canadian government asked the Connaught Laboratories to initiate mass production of penicillin. The Spadina Building was purchased by the University of Toronto for the purpose, and refurbished at a cost of Canadian $1.2 million (equivalent to Canadian $22 million in 2025), split equally between the university and the government. Penicillin was initially cultured in 200,000 bottles occupying 740 square metres (8,000 sq ft) of air-conditioned laboratory space. Production was switched to the deep submergence method in November 1945.

=== Continental Europe ===
A translation of the Oxford team's 1941 report reached Germany via Sweden the following year. On 6 December 1943, the Reich Health Ministry ordered the medical community to conduct research into penicillin and other antibiotics. Three vials of penicillin captured by the Afrika Korps reached Germany in 1943 and one was sent to Heinz Öppinger at Hoechst in Frankfurt, who began conducting experiments with moulds. Penicillin was produced there in 300-litre batches, and Öppinger developed a rotating drum for a deep-tank fermentation process.

Research was also carried out by Schering in Berlin using a sample of Fleming's mould, which they failed to cultivate; their efforts to determine the chemical structure of penicillin were also unsuccessful. Maria Brommelhues at IG Farben's Bacteriological Laboratory in Elberfeld catalogued different species of penicillin. Hitler's personal physician, Theodor Morell, treated Hitler with penicillin for injuries sustained in the 20 July 1944 assassination attempt. Information about penicillin research in Germany was gathered by the Manhattan Project's Alsos Mission and forwarded to Florey in the UK. (Note: Although the Alsos Mission was primarily concerned with nuclear technology, it had a broader mission to gather information on German scientific war research.)

Much of Germany's penicillin came from Czechoslovakia, where research was carried out at Charles University in Prague and the Fragner Pharmaceutical Company by a team that included chemist Karel Wiesner. Work was also conducted in secret in France and at the Delft University of Technology in the Netherlands. In 1946 and 1947, penicillin factories were established in Belarus, Ukraine, Poland, Italy and Yugoslavia with physical plant and expertise from Canada through the United Nations Relief and Rehabilitation Administration (UNRRA), of which Canadian Lester B. Pearson was the head of its supply committee. UNRRA was wound up in 1948, and its penicillin responsibilities were transferred to the World Health Organization (WHO).

In Italy, Domenico Marotta negotiated with UNRRA for a penicillin plant to be built near the Sapienza University of Rome. This took longer than expected and construction did not commence until 1948. In the meantime, Chain came to the Istituto Superiore di Sanità to deliver a series of lectures on penicillin and Marotta took the opportunity to recruit him as a colleague. Chain suggested that instead of building a pilot plant, they use the UNRRA money to build an institute for research into penicillin. This became the largest of its kind in the world, with over one hundred chemists, biochemists, microbiologists and technicians, and was soon at the forefront of research into semisynthetic penicillin.

=== Japan ===
Manfred Kiese at the Pharmacological Institute in Berlin published a survey of literature on antibiotics in the 7 August 1943 issue of Klinische Wochenschrift that included the Oxford team's publications. A copy was acquired by the Japanese embassy in Berlin and taken to Japan on the Japanese submarine I-8, which docked at Kure, Hiroshima, on 21 December 1943. The article was translated into Japanese, and production of penicillin was underway by 1 February 1944. By mid-May, a research team under Hamao Umezawa had tested 750 different strains of mould and found that 75 exhibited antibiotic activity. Experiments were conducted on mice to determine efficacy and toxicity. The Morinaga Milk company had a small penicillin production plant in operation in Mishima, Shizuoka, by the end of the year, and the Banyu Pharmaceutical Company opened a small plant in Okazaki, Aichi, in January 1945. The penicillin was called "Hekiso" after its blue colour. By 1948 Japan had become the third country, after the US and UK, to become self-sufficient in penicillin, and exports to China and Korea began the following year.

=== United Kingdom ===
In the UK, the firm Kemball, Bishop & Co. was asked in early 1941 if it could produce 45,000 litres (10,000 imp gal) of raw penicillin brew. Like Pfizer, with which it had a commercial relationship, it was a small firm, but one with experience in fermentation techniques as a manufacturer of citric acid. It was unable to do it at the time, but on 23 February 1942, Florey received an offer from Kemball, Bishop & Co. of a more modest effort of 910 litres (200 imp gal) every ten days. Work commenced at its Bromley-by-Bow plant on 5 March 1942 and the first trays of mould were seeded on 25 March.

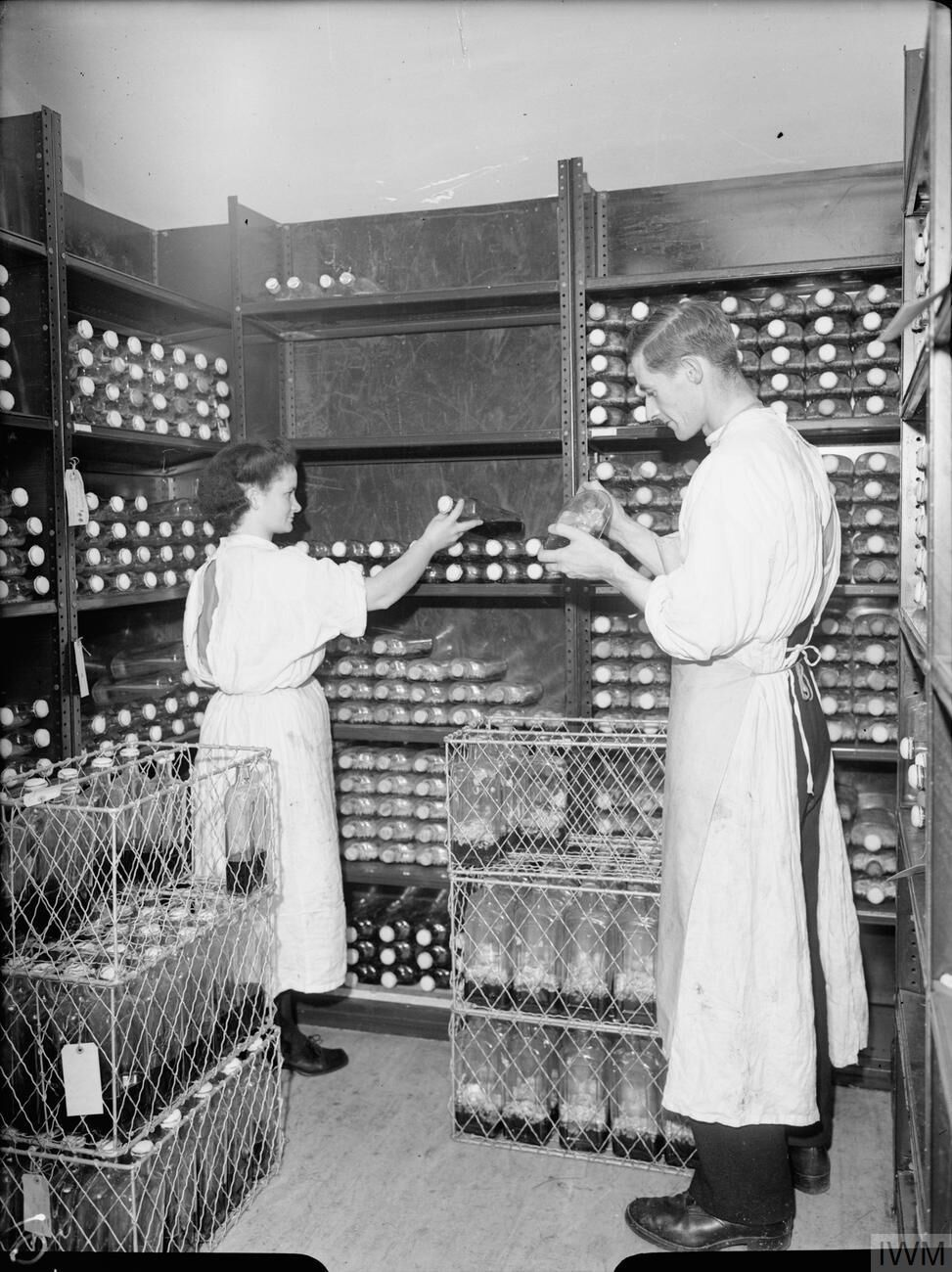
Penicillin production at the Royal Navy Medical School in Clevedon, Somerset, in 1944

Wartime conditions, including German bombing, made progress difficult. The 55-litre (12 imp gal) milk churns needed for shipment were in short supply, and special arrangements were made with the Ministry of Supply. The brew was initially despatched by rail to minimise the use of rationed petrol. The first 680 litres (150 imp gal) of brew, containing 6.1 million units at 9 units per mL, were delivered to Florey on 28 October 1942. Kemball, Bishop & Co. built an extraction plant, which became operational on 24 November 1943.

In the meantime, Imperial Chemical Industries (ICI) had established a small production unit at its plant in Blackley and had begun shipments in December 1941. In May 1942, production moved to a purpose-built plant at Trafford Park, which initially produced two million Oxford units of penicillin per week. Production was ramped up to sixty million units per week by the time the plant was closed in March 1944; production shifted thereafter to a new plant that produced 300 million units per week. In 1947 ICI decided to construct a new plant to produce 32,000 litres (7,000 imp gal) of penicillin per day by the deep submergence method.

Glaxo Laboratories opened a small production plant at Greenford in December 1942 that produced 70 litres of penicillin broth per week. In February 1943, it opened a second plant at Aylesbury. Initially it used the techniques developed at Oxford, but in September 1943 it switched to using corn steep liquor as a medium, and switched to using the NRRL 1249.B21 strain of mould provided by Coghill. In 1943, Glaxo was responsible for 2,570 million of the 3,500 million Oxford units produced in the UK. Glaxo opened a third factory at Watford in February 1944 and a fourth at Stratford, London, in January 1945. The company was responsible for 80 per cent of the UK's output up to June 1944.

In 1944 the Ministry of Supply arranged for the Commercial Solvents Company to install the first deep submergence plant at Speke, and it asked Glaxo to build one too. This new Glaxo plant opened at Barnard Castle in January 1946 and produced more penicillin over the next nine months than its surface plants had produced in all of 1945. The surface plants were all closed in 1946. Penicillin production in the UK increased from 25 million units per week in March 1943 to 30 billion per week in 1946.

=== United States ===
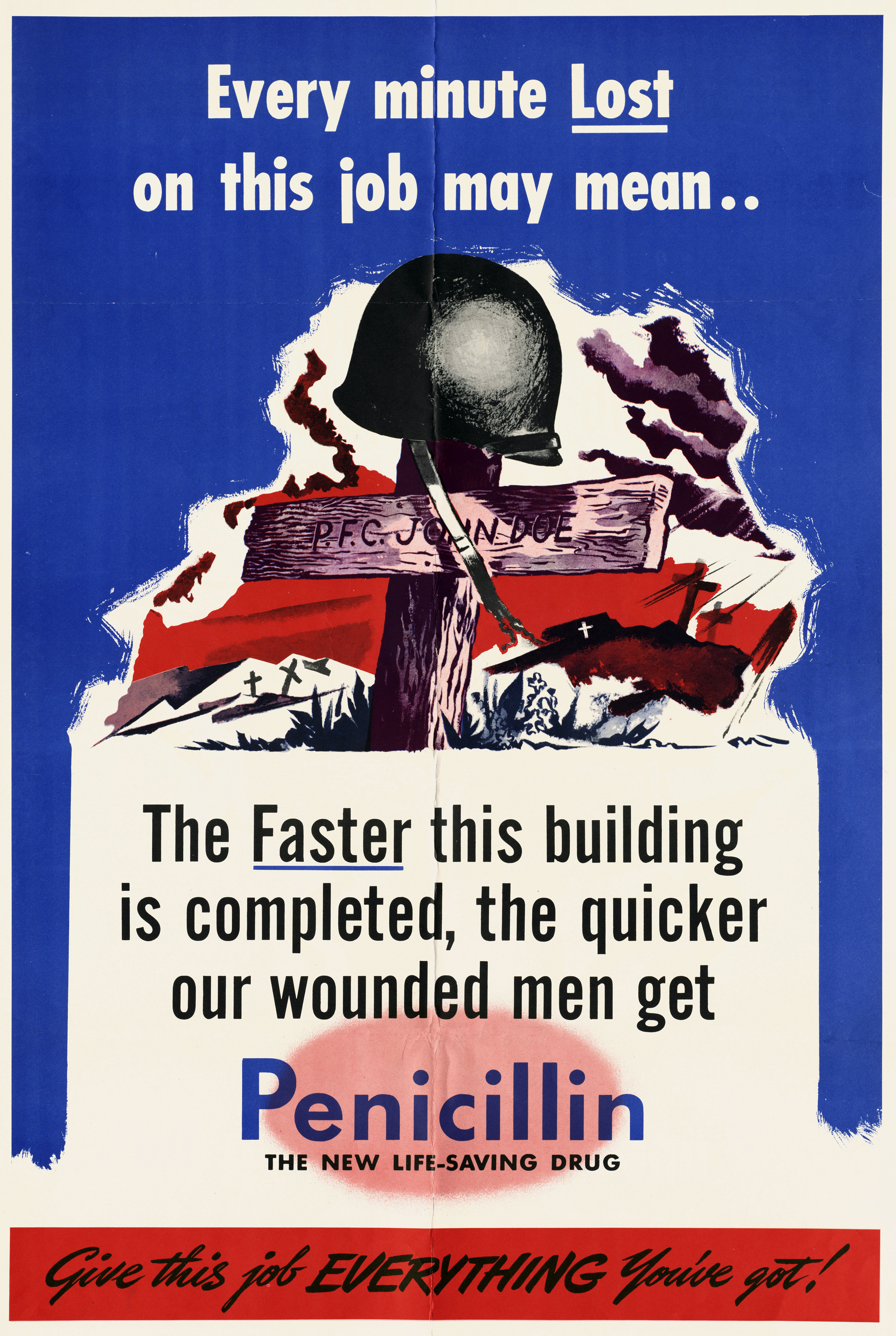
Construction workers are exhorted to complete work on penicillin plants.

The WPB placed penicillin under a wartime allocation system on 16 July 1943. All supplies were designated for use by the armed forces and the Public Health Service. Penicillin production in the United States ramped up from 800 million Oxford units in the first half of 1943 to 20 billion units in the second half. The US government built six production plants at a cost of $7.6 million (equivalent to $139 million in 2025). These were sold after the war to the companies that operated them for $3.4 million (equivalent to $56 million in 2025). Another sixteen plants were built by the private sector for $22.6 million (equivalent to $413 million in 2025), although $14.5 million (equivalent to $265 million in 2025) was approved for accelerated depreciation under which the cost could be written off in five years instead of the usual twelve to fifteen.

US penicillin production rose from 21 billion units in 1943, to 1,663 billion units in 1944 and an estimated 6,852 billion units in 1945. By June 1944, Pfizer alone was producing 70 billion units per month. Monthly production dropped off after July 1945 due to a shortage of corn-steep liquor. The price offered by the CMR for a million units fell from $200 in 1943 (equivalent to $4,000 in 2025), which was below its manufacturing cost, to $6 in 1945 (equivalent to $107 in 2025).

The chairman of the NRC committee on chemotherapy, Chester Keefer, was responsible for administering the equitable distribution of penicillin for civilian use on behalf of the CMR. As the news of the effectiveness of penicillin spread, he had to deal with a large volume of requests for the drug. Supplies for civilian use were initially small, and penicillin was initially provided only for cases with a high mortality rate that did not respond to other forms of treatment. In January 1943, he reported to OSRD on the results of the treatment of the first 100 patients; by August, 500 patients had been treated. Military requirements consumed 85 per cent of production in 1944. This dropped to 30 per cent in 1945, but civilian demands for penicillin exceeded allocations.

By April 1944 supply and demand had exceeded the ability of one man to administer, and the task was handed over to a Penicillin Producers Industry Advisory Committee that distributed supplies through a network of depot hospitals. By 1945, there were 2,700 depot hospitals holding supplies of penicillin, and another 5,000 hospitals receiving supplies through them. Penicillin became commercially available by the end of the year, by which time the United States was exporting 200 billion units a month. By 1956, only twelve of the twenty-one firms that produced penicillin during the war were still involved in its manufacture.

== In the field ==
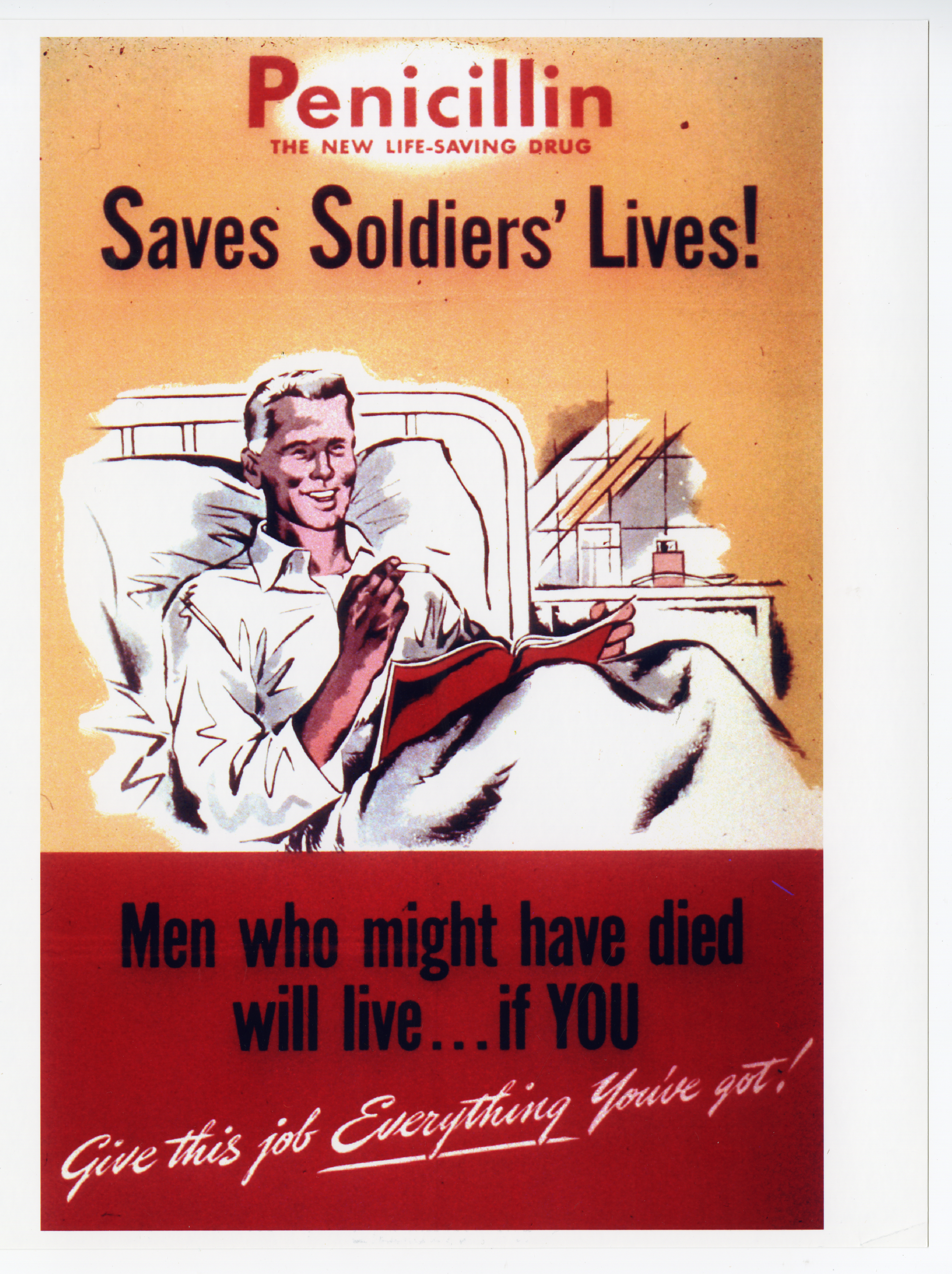
Poster touting the value of penicillin to inspire workers

In 1943, the Medical Research Council decided that the time had come for field trials of penicillin. The location of centres to receive the drug was kept secret so as to not provoke demand for the drug when it was still in short supply. Howard Florey was sent to North Africa, where the North African campaign was ongoing. On 29 June he was joined by Hugh Cairns, another Rhodes Scholar from Adelaide, who now held the rank of brigadier in the British Army, and was in charge of the Military Hospital for head injuries in Oxford, who brought with him a stockpile of 40 million units of penicillin.

Over the next two months Florey and Cairns treated over one hundred cases and compiled a report that ran to over a hundred pages. They also filmed their activities. Florey gave lectures on penicillin, and his report contained recommendations for training of medical officers in its use. The fighting in North Africa had ended in May 1943, so most of the cases he saw were not recently wounded soldiers, but ones with old wounds that had not healed; battle casualties began arriving again after the Allied invasion of Sicily in July.

Florey considered that the source of infection in many cases was the hospital rather than the battlefield, and advocated changes to the way that patients were treated to take advantage of the properties of penicillin. He argued that wounds should be cleaned and sealed up promptly. This was a radical idea; normally it would have been inviting gas gangrene, but he proposed leaving that to the penicillin. His recommendations were acted upon; the War Office established a training course for pathologists and clinicians at the Royal Herbert Hospital, which made use of film that Florey shot in North Africa.

Although he intended that penicillin be used to treat the seriously wounded, there were large numbers of bacterial sexually transmitted infection cases, against which penicillin was particularly effective, and from a military point of view being able to cure gonorrhea in 48 hours was a breakthrough. The supply situation improved, and 20 million units per day were made available for Allied invasion of Italy in September. During the campaign in Western Europe in 1944–1945, penicillin was widely used both to treat infected wounds and as a prophylactic to prevent wounds from becoming infected. Gas gangrene had killed 150 out of every 1,000 casualties in the First World War, but the instance of this disease now disappeared almost completely. Open fractures now had a recovery rate of better than 94 per cent, and recovery from burns of one-fifth of the body or less was 100 per cent.

== Chemical analysis ==
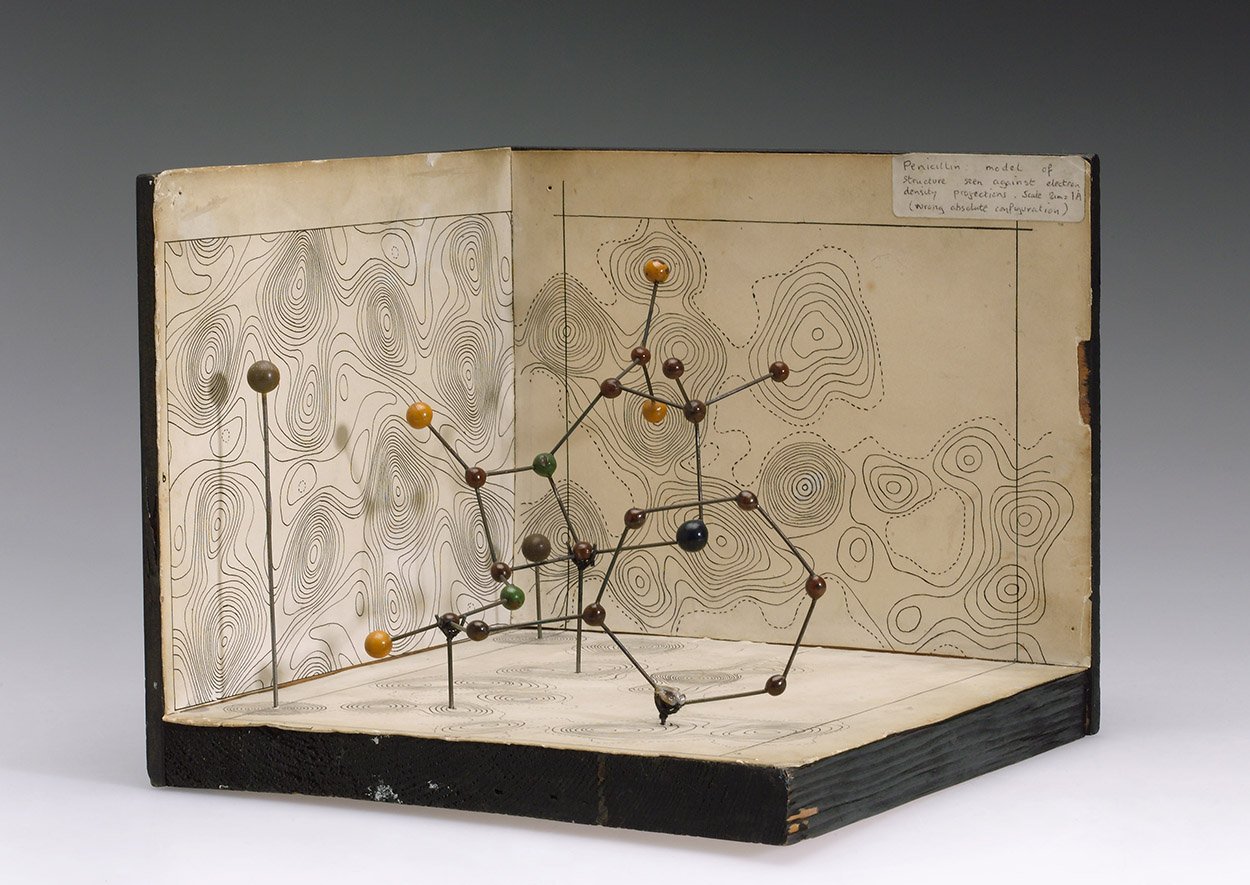
1945 molecular model of Penicillin by Dorothy Hodgkin

The chemical structure of penicillin was first suggested by Abraham in 1942. Dorothy Hodgkin determined the correct chemical structure of penicillin using X-ray crystallography at Oxford in 1945. In 1945, the US Committee on Medical Research and the British Medical Research Council jointly published in Science chemical analyses conducted at different universities, pharmaceutical companies and government research departments. The report announced the existence of different forms of penicillin compounds which all shared the same structural component called β-lactam. The penicillins were designated by Roman numerals in UK (penicillin I, II, III and IV) in order of their discoveries, and known by letters (F, G, X, and K) referring to their origins or sources in the US, as below:

UK nomenclature	US nomenclature	Chemical name
Penicillin I	Penicillin F	2-Pentenylpenicillin
Penicillin II	Penicillin G	Benzylpenicillin
Penicillin III	Penicillin X	p-Hydroxybenzylpenicillin
Penicillin IV	Penicillin K	n-Heptylpenicillin

The chemical names were based on the side chains of the compounds. In 1948, Chain introduced the chemical names as standard nomenclature, remarking that this would "make the nomenclature as far as possible unambiguous".

In Kundl, Tyrol, Austria, in 1952, Hans Margreiter and Ernst Brandl of Biochemie developed the first acid-stable penicillin for oral administration, penicillin V. American chemist John C. Sheehan at the Massachusetts Institute of Technology (MIT) completed the first chemical synthesis of penicillin V in 1957. Sheehan had started his studies into penicillin synthesis in 1948, and during these investigations developed new methods for the synthesis of peptides, as well as new protecting groups—groups that mask the reactivity of certain functional groups. Although the initial synthesis developed by Sheehan was not appropriate for mass production of penicillins, one of the intermediate compounds in Sheehan's synthesis was 6-aminopenicillanic acid (6-APA), the nucleus of penicillin.

An important development was the discovery of 6-APA itself. In 1957, researchers at the Beecham Research Laboratories in Surrey isolated 6-APA from the culture media of P. chrysogenum. 6-APA was found to constitute the core nucleus of penicillin (and subsequently many β-lactam antibiotics) and was easily chemically modified by attaching side chains through chemical reactions. The discovery was published in Nature in 1959. This paved the way for new and improved drugs as all semisynthetic penicillins are produced from chemical manipulation of 6-APA.

The second-generation semisynthetic β-lactam antibiotic methicillin, designed to counter first-generation-resistant penicillinases, was introduced in the United Kingdom in 1959. Methicillin-resistant forms of S. aureus (MRSA) were first observed in the UK in 1960, less than a year later. It is likely that MRSA strains already existed many years before methicillin was introduced. This demonstrated that new drugs intended to circumvent known resistance mechanisms could be rendered ineffective by bacterial adaptations caused by the widespread use of other antibiotics.

== Patents ==
Penicillin patents became a matter of concern and conflict. Chain had wanted to apply for a patent but Florey had objected, arguing that penicillin should benefit all. Florey sought the advice of Sir Henry Dale, the chairman of the Wellcome Trust and a member of the Scientific Advisory Panel to the British Cabinet, and John William Trevan, the director of the Wellcome Trust Research Laboratory. On 26 and 27 March 1941, Dale and Trevan met at Oxford University's Sir William Dunn School of Pathology to discuss the issue. Dale advised that patenting penicillin would be unethical. Undeterred, Chain approached Sir Edward Mellanby, then Secretary of the Medical Research Council, who also objected on ethical grounds. As Chain later admitted, he had "many bitter fights" with Mellanby, but Mellanby's decision was accepted as final.

In 1945, Moyer patented the methods for production and isolation of penicillin. He could not obtain patents in the US as an employee of the NRRL, but filed for patents with the British Patent Office. He gave the license to a US company, Commercial Solvents Corporation. When Fleming learnt of the American patents on penicillin production, he was incensed and commented:

I found penicillin and have given it free for the benefit of humanity. Why should it become a profit-making monopoly of manufacturers in another country?

The patenting of penicillin-related technologies by US companies gave rise to a myth in the UK that British scientists had done the work but American ones garnered the rewards. When the Rockefeller Foundation published its annual report in 1944, The Evening News contrasted the foundation's generous support of the Oxford team's work with that of the parsimonious MRC. In April 1945, the British firm Glaxo signed agreements with Squibb and Merck under which it paid 5 per cent royalties on its sales of penicillin for five years in return for the use of their deep submergence fermentation techniques. Glaxo paid almost £500,000 (equivalent to £10,800,000 in 2025) in royalties between 1946 and 1956. The controversy over patents led to the establishment of the UK National Research Development Corporation (NRDC) in June 1948. This organisation collected government patents and charged royalties on them.

== Nobel Prize ==
After the news about the curative properties of penicillin broke in an editorial in The Times on 27 August 1942, Fleming enjoyed the publicity, but Howard Florey did not: he feared that this would create a demand for penicillin that he did not yet have to give. When the press arrived at the Sir William Dunn School, he told his secretary to "send them packing". He also prohibited his team from speaking to the press. Confusion resulted from the fact that the mould juice and the drug produced from it were both called penicillin. Distorted and inaccurate accounts were published and broadcast giving Fleming credit for the development of penicillin, accounts that Fleming and St. Mary's Hospital made little or no effort to correct. The story the media wished to tell was the familiar one of the lone scientist and the serendipitous discovery. The British medical historian Bill Bynum later wrote:

The discovery and development of penicillin is an object lesson of modernity: the contrast between an alert individual (Fleming) making an isolated observation and the exploitation of the observation through teamwork and the scientific division of labour (Florey and his group). The discovery was old science, but the drug itself required new ways of doing science.

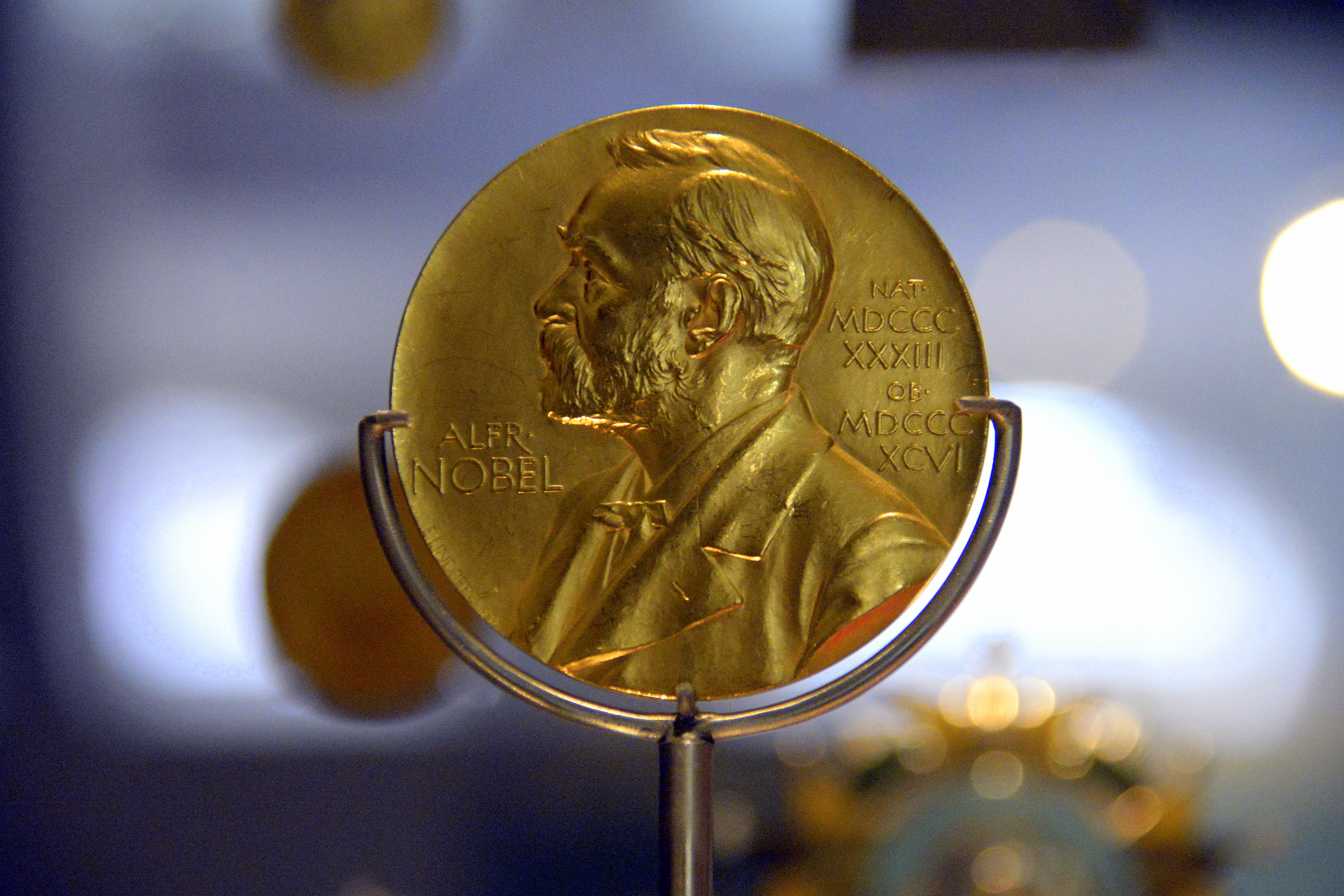
Nobel Prize in Physiology or Medicine medal awarded to Sir Alexander Fleming, on display at the National Museum of Scotland

In 1943, the Nobel committee received a single nomination for the Nobel Prize in Physiology or Medicine for Fleming and Florey from the British biochemist Rudolph Peters. The secretary of the Nobel committee, Göran Liljestrand, made an assessment of Fleming and Florey in the same year, but little was known about penicillin in Sweden at the time, and he concluded that more information was required. The following year, there was one nomination for Fleming alone and one for Fleming, Florey and Chain. Liljestrand and Nanna Svartz, the professor of medicine at the Karolinska Institute, considered their work, and while both judged Fleming and Florey equally worthy of a Nobel Prize, the Nobel committee was divided, and decided to award the prize that year instead to Joseph Erlanger and Herbert S. Gasser "for their discoveries relating to the highly differentiated functions of single nerve fibres".

There were a large number of nominations for Florey and Fleming or both in 1945, and one for Chain, from Liljestrand, who nominated all three. Liljestrand noted that thirteen of the first sixteen nominations that came in mentioned Fleming, but only three mentioned him alone. This time evaluations were made by Liljestrand, Sven Hellerström and Anders Kristenson, who endorsed all three.

There were rumours that the committee would award the prize to Fleming alone, or half to Fleming and one-quarter each to Florey and Chain. Fulton and Dale lobbied for the award to be given to Florey. The Nobel Assembly at the Karolinska Institute did consider awarding half to Fleming and one-quarter each to Florey and Chain, but in the end decided to divide it equally three ways. On 25 October 1945, it announced that Fleming, Florey and Chain equally shared the 1945 Nobel Prize in Physiology or Medicine "for the discovery of penicillin and its curative effect in various infectious diseases." When The New York Times announced that "Fleming and Two Co-Workers" had won the prize, Fulton demanded – and received – a correction in an editorial the next day.

Dorothy Hodgkin received the 1964 Nobel Prize in Chemistry "for her determinations by X-ray techniques of the structures of important biochemical substances", most notably penicillin and vitamin B_{12}. She became only the third woman to receive the Nobel Prize in Chemistry, after Marie Curie in 1911 and Irène Joliot-Curie in 1935.

== Development of penicillin derivatives ==
The narrow range of treatable diseases or "spectrum of activity" of the penicillins, along with the poor activity of the orally active penicillin V, led to the search for derivatives of penicillin that could treat a wider range of infections. The isolation of 6-APA, the nucleus of penicillin, allowed for the preparation of semisynthetic penicillins, with various improvements over benzylpenicillin. Ampicillin was developed by the Beecham Research Laboratories in London. When introduced to clinical use in 1961 it was the first semisynthetic penicillin that could be taken orally that was effective against both Gram-negative and Gram-positive bacteria, whereas the original was only effective against Gram-positive.

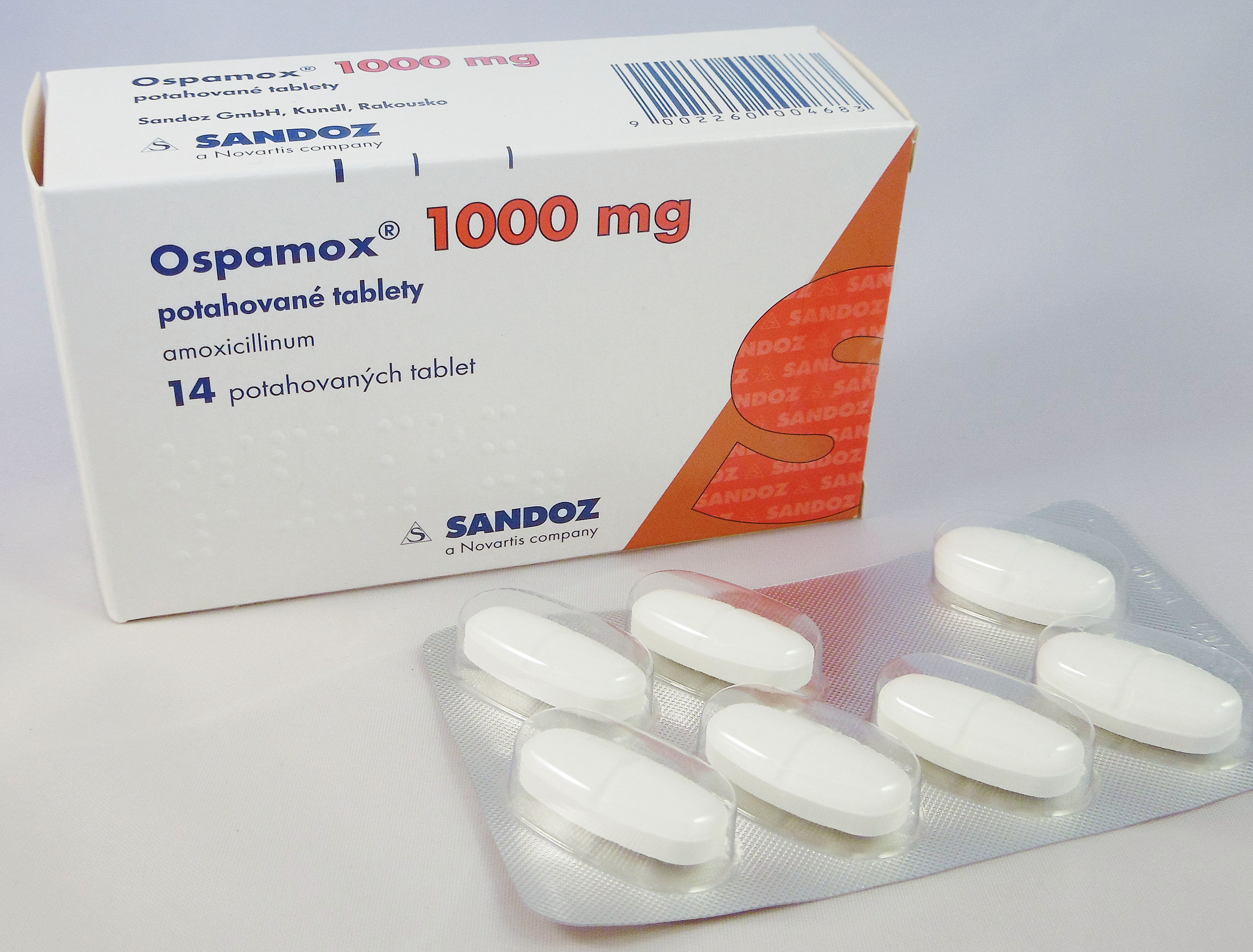
Amoxicillin

Further development yielded β-lactamase-resistant penicillins, including flucloxacillin, dicloxacillin, and methicillin. These were significant for their activity against β-lactamase-producing bacterial species, but were ineffective against the MRSA strains.

Another development of the line of penicillins was the antipseudomonal penicillins, such as carbenicillin, ticarcillin, and piperacillin, useful for their activity against Gram-negative bacteria. The usefulness of the β-lactam ring was such that related antibiotics, including the mecillinams, the carbapenems and, most important, the cephalosporins, still retain it at the centre of their structures.

β-lactam penicillins became the most widely used antibiotics in the world. Amoxicillin and ampicillin, semisynthetic penicillins developed by Beecham Research Laboratories, were the most popular antibiotics for outpatient care in the United States at the end of the 20th century, and amoxicillin widely used in swine medicine. In the early 21st century, antibiotic preferences differed from country to country: in Europe, amoxicillin was widely used in the UK and Germany; France, Italy and Spain preferred broad-spectrum combinations like co-amoxiclav; and the Scandinavian countries relied on narrow-spectrum penicillin V.

== Antibiotic resistance ==
In 1940, Ernst Chain and Edward Abraham reported the first indication of antibiotic resistance to penicillin, an E. coli strain that produced the penicillinase enzyme, which was capable of breaking down penicillin and negating its antibacterial effect. Chain and Abraham worked out the chemical nature of penicillinase which they reported in Nature as:

The conclusion that the active substance is an enzyme is drawn from the fact that it is destroyed by heating at 90° for 5 minutes and by incubation with papain activated with potassium cyanide at pH 6, and that it is non-dialysable through "cellophane" membranes.

In his Nobel lecture, Fleming warned of the possibility of penicillin resistance in clinical conditions:

The time may come when penicillin can be bought by anyone in the shops. Then there is the danger that the ignorant man may easily underdose himself and by exposing his microbes to non-lethal quantities of the drug make them resistant.

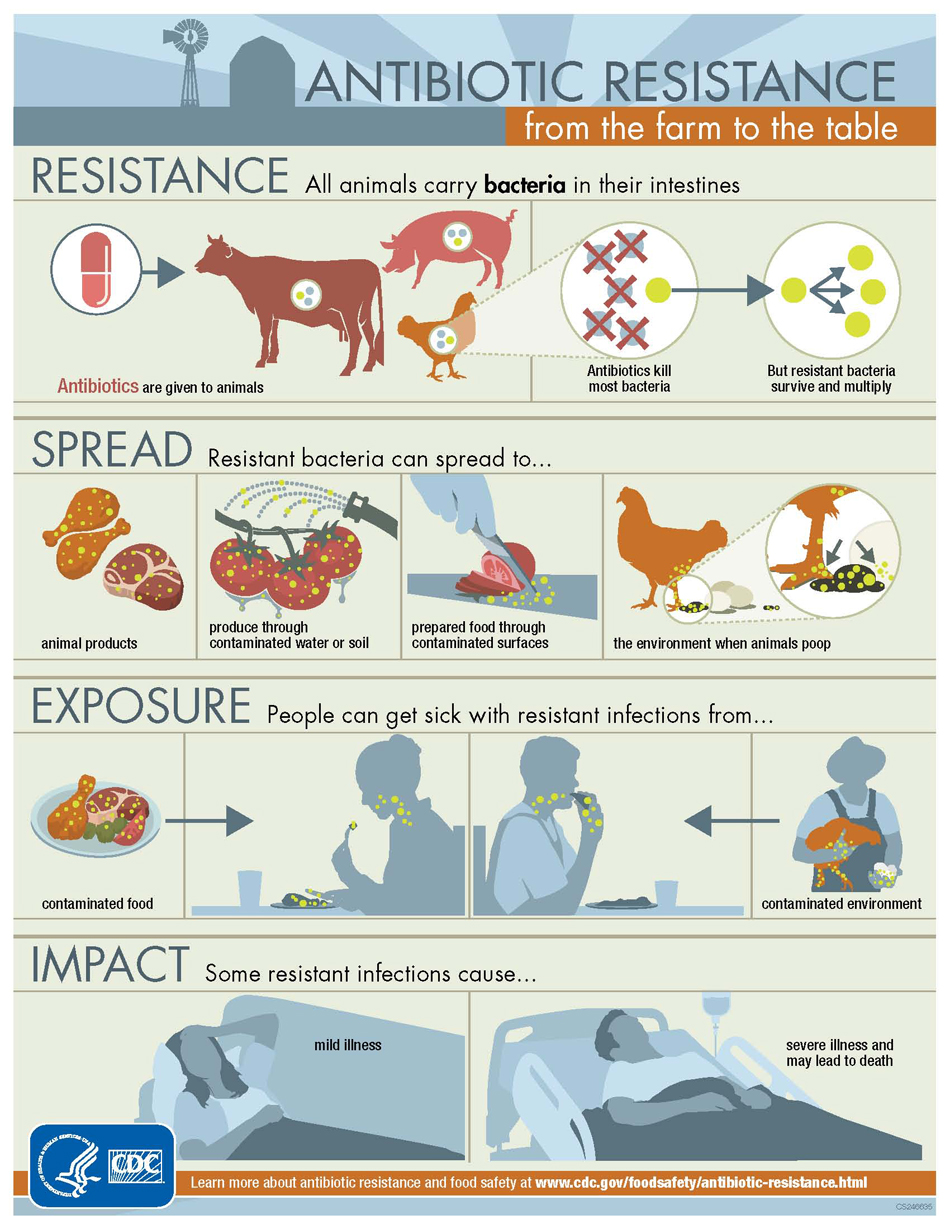
Antibiotic resistance is a growing public health concern.

At the time, only poisons required a doctor's prescription, and self-treatment was a real possibility. Legislation was passed in the UK in 1947 to require a prescription for antibiotics. The United States followed in 1951. Elsewhere in the world, the export of Western pharmaceuticals diffused faster than Western medical knowledge and practices, and penicillin was often dispensed by practitioners of traditional medicine. As late as 1999, a study in the UK found that 39 per cent of respondents erroneously believed that antibiotics could cure colds and flu, and 12 per cent believed that they were the best treatment for them. The misplaced faith in antibiotics had serious consequences. It reduced the status of doctors to providers of pills. Many more people sought medical attention for ailments they would have ignored before, and they often demanded antibiotics. For their part, overworked doctors were increasingly willing to provide them even if not asked to do so.

By 1942, some strains of Staphylococcus aureus had developed a strong resistance to penicillin and many strains were resistant by the 1960s. In 1946, bacteriologist Mary Barber began a study of penicillin resistance through natural selection at Hammersmith Hospital in London. She found that in 1946, seven out of eight bacterial infections were susceptible to penicillin, but two years later only three out of eight were. Nurses were exposed to both bacteria and penicillin and harboured and transmitted bacterial infections. Barber found that three out of ten student midwives were colonized by bacteria when they arrived; after three months, seven out of ten were. The problem was sloppy hygiene practices by health care workers, poor medical practices like prophylactic use of antibiotics, and slipshod administrative practices, such as taking babies from their mothers to large hospital nurseries where they could infect each other.

Antibiotic-resistant infections were reported in Australia in 1952. During the 1957–1958 influenza pandemic there were 16,000 deaths in the UK and 80,000 in the US from bacterial complications; 28 per cent of those who contracted pneumonia died. Most cases of pneumonia were contracted in hospitals, and many of these were antibiotic-resistant strains that had been nurtured there. In 1965, the first case of penicillin resistance in Streptococcus pneumoniae was reported from Boston. Since then other strains and species of bacteria have developed resistance.

== Use in agriculture ==
Research conducted by the American Cyanamid laboratories in the late 1940s and early 1950s demonstrated that adding penicillin to chicks' feed increased their weight gain by 10 per cent. The reasons for this were still subject to debate in the twenty-first century. Subsequent research indicated that adding penicillin to animal feed also improved feed conversion efficiency, promoted more uniform growth and facilitated disease control. After the Food and Drug Administration (FDA) approved the use of penicillin as feed additives for poultry and livestock in 1951, the pharmaceutical companies ramped up production to meet the demand.

Antibiotic use in livestock

By 1954, the United States was producing 910 t (2 million lb) of antibiotics each year, of which 220 t (490,000 lb) was going into animal feed; in the 1990s, the United States was producing 23,000 t (50 million lb) of antibiotics per year, of which half was going to livestock. The largest user remained the poultry industry, which consumed 4,800 t (10.5 million lb) of antibiotics each year, compared to 4,700 t (10.3 million lb) for hogs and 1,700 t (3.7 million lb) for cattle. A 1981 study by the Council for Agricultural Science and Technology estimated that banning their use in animal feed could cost American consumers up to $3.5 billion a year (equivalent to $12.39 billion in 2025) in increased food prices. The story was similar in the UK, where 44 per cent of antibiotic production was consumed by animals by 1963.

By the mid-1950s, there were reports in the United States that milk was not curdling to make cheese. The FDA found that the milk was contaminated with penicillin, which was killing the bacteria required for cheesemaking. In 1963, the WHO reported high levels of penicillin in milk worldwide. People who were allergic to penicillin could now get a reaction from drinking milk. A committee chaired by Lord Netherthorpe was established in the UK in 1960 to inquire into the use of antibiotics in animal feed. In 1962, the committee recommended that restrictions on the use of antibiotics in animals be relaxed. It contended that the benefits were substantial and that even if bacteria became resistant, new antibiotics would soon be developed, and there was no evidence that bacterial resistance in animals impacted human health.

The Netherthorpe committee's conclusions were undermined by new research even before they were published, and the committee was recalled to reconsider the issue in 1965. New studies had shown that bacteria were not only able to inherit the genes for antibiotic resistance, but they could also communicate them to each other. In 1967, a multiresistant strain of E. coli killed fifteen children in the UK. The use of antibiotics in animals for nontherapeutic use was banned there in 1971. Many other European countries soon followed.

When Sweden acceded to the European Union (EU) in 1995, a total ban on antibiotic growth promoters (AGPs) had been in place there for ten years. This would be superseded by more relaxed EU rules unless Sweden could demonstrate scientific evidence in favour of a ban. Two Swedish scientists, Anders Franklin and Christina Greko, and two Danish scientists, Frank Aarestrup and Henrik Wegener, took up the fight. The odds seemed against them but this coincided with the United Kingdom BSE outbreak, which resulted in intense political pressure. In December 1996, the European Parliament's Standing Committee on Health and Welfare voted to ban the use of AGPs. The EU went further and recommended broad restrictions on the use of antibiotics. These regulations were adopted in 2019 and took effect in 2022.
