= Lipman =

Lipman is the name of:

== People with the surname ==
- Alan Lipman, American clinical psychologist and pundit
- Blaise Godbe Lipman, American actor and director
- Daniel Lipman, writer and producer from Baltimore, Maryland, United States
- David J. Lipman, American biologist and director of the National Center for Biotechnology Information (NCBI)
- Elinor Lipman, American novelist
- Emma Lipman, English-Maltese footballer
- Esther Lipman MBE née Solomon (1900–1991), Adelaide, South Australia's first woman councillor
- Hymen Lipman (also Hyman Lipman), who first patented the pencil with an attached eraser
- Ira A. Lipman (1940–2019), American businessman and philanthropist
- Jacob Goodale Lipman, soil chemist
- Jerzy Lipman, cinematographer
- Jonas Alfred Lipman (1877–1958), Australian stage and film actor, producer and director
- Joseph Lipman, Canadian-American mathematician
- Kirov Lipman, Latvian businessman and ice hockey executive
- Lori Lipman Brown, Nevada state senator
- Maria Lipman, Russian journalist and political scientist
- Matthew Lipman, founder of Philosophy for Children
- Maureen Lipman, British actress and comedian
- Mel Lipman, attorney from Nevada and father of Lori Lipman Brown
- Michael Lipman, English rugby union player
- Miriam Olmstead Lipman (1885–1980), American bacteriologist
- Rex Lipman (1922–2015), Australian entrepreneur
- Samuel Lipman (1934–1994), music and cultural critic, founder of New Criterion magazine
- Ted Lipman (1953- ) Canadian diplomat and sinologist
- Wynona Lipman (1923–1999), first African-American woman elected to the New Jersey Senate

== People with the given name ==
- Lipman Bers, Latvian mathematician and activist
- Lipman Pike, known as Lip Pike, American home run champion baseball player

== See also ==
- Lipmann
- Lippman
- Lippmann
- Liepmann
