= Liepmann =

Liepmann is a surname. Notable people with the surname include:

- Hans W. Liepmann (1914–2009), German American engineer, emeritus professor of aeronautics at the California Institute of Technology
- Heinrich Liepmann (1904-1983), German-British political economist
- Heinz Liepmann (1905–1966), German writer and journalist
- Hugo Liepmann (1863–1925), German neurologist

== See also ==
- Liebmann
- Lippmann
