= Lippman =

Lippman is a surname. Notable people with the surname include:

== People ==
- Abby Lippman (1939–2017), Canadian epidemiologist and women's rights activist
- Andrew B. Lippman (fl. 2000), American researcher
- Doris Troth Lippman (fl. 2000), American professor of nursing
- John Lippman, American television executive and the acting director of Voice of America
- Jonathan Lippman (born 1945), American jurist
- Laura Lippman (born 1959), American author of detective fiction
- Michael Lippman (1946–2025), American music manager
- Sally Lippman (1900-1982), also known as Disco Sally, American lawyer and Studio 54 dancer
- Stanley B. Lippman (1950–2022), American computer scientist and author
- Thomas Lippman (born 1940), American journalist and author

== Fictional characters ==
- Mr. Lippman, a recurring character in Seinfeld

== See also ==
- Lipman
- Lipmann
- Lippmann
