= Liebmann =

Liebmann is a surname that may refer to:

- Axel Liebmann (1849–1876), Danish composer
- Barry Liebmann (1953–2017), comedy writer for MAD Magazine
- Charles Liebmann (1837–1928), German-born, American brewer
- Frederik Michael Liebmann (1813–1856), Danish botanist
- Helen Liebmann, British cellist, member of Penguin Cafe Orchestra
- Henry Liebmann (1836–1915), German-born, American brewer
- Johannes Liebmann (born 2007), German swimmer
- Joseph Liebmann (1831–1913), German-born, American brewer
- Morris Liebmann, after whom the IEEE Morris N. Liebmann Memorial Award (former IRE Morris Liebmann Memorial Prize) is named
- Nanna Liebmann (1849–1935), Danish music educator, music critic, concert promoter and composer
- Otto Liebmann (1840–1912), German philosopher
- Samuel Liebmann (1799–1872), German-born, American brewer
- Steve Liebmann (born 1944), Australian television presenter

Liebman may refer to:

- Charles Liebman (1934-2003), American-Israeli political scientist
- Dave Liebman (born 1946), saxophonist and flutist
- Jeffrey Liebman (born 1967), professor of public sector economics at Harvard University
- Joshua L. Liebman (1907-1948), American rabbi and author
- Judith Liebman, American engineer, president of Operations Research Society of America
- Lance Liebman (born 1941), Director of the American Law Institute and law professor at Columbia University
- Marvin Liebman (1923–1997), conservative activist and fundraiser
- Wendy Liebman (born 1961), American stand-up comedian

== Arts ==
- Liebmann (The Strange Summer), a 2016 German film directed by Jules Herrmann

== See also ==
- Leibman
- Leibmann
- Libman
- Lippmann
- Liepmann
