= Miriam Olmstead Lipman =

American bacteriologist

- Born: Miriam Parmerton Olmstead; July 9, 1885; Middletown, Connecticut, U.S.
- Died: September 5, 1980 (aged 95); Bridgeport, Connecticut, U.S.
- Occupation: Bacteriologist

Miriam Parmerton Olmstead Lipman (July 9, 1885 – September 5, 1980) was an American bacteriologist based at Columbia Presbyterian Medical Center in New York City.

== Biography ==
Olmstead was born in Middletown, Connecticut, the daughter of James Olmstead and Emma Parmerton Olmstead. Her father, a doctor and superintendent of the Connecticut Hospital for the Insane, died when Olmstead was a girl. She lived in New Hampshire and Vermont with her widowed mother, graduated from Smith College in 1908, with further training at the University of Freiburg in Germany.

Lipman worked as a bacteriologist at the Columbia Presbyterian Medical Center in New York City, researching bacteria involved in diseases including pertussis, influenza, endocarditis, filariasis, and rheumatoid arthritis.

Olmstead married artist Michael Henry Lipman in 1917. They had three children. Her husband died in 1941, and she died in 1980, at the age of 95, at her home in Bridgeport, Connecticut.

== Publications ==
Lipman's research was published in scholarly journals including Archives of Internal Medicine, Experimental Biology and Medicine, Journal of Clinical Investigation, and The American Journal of Medicine.

- "Complement fixation in pertussis" (1915, with Paul Luttinger)
- "A bacteriological report of influenza cases at Presbyterian Hospital" (1918)
- "Variation in the Hemolytic Streptococci" (1938, with Martin Henry Dawson and Gladys L. Hobby)
- "Penicillin Sensitivity of Strains of Non-hemolytic Streptococci Isolated from Gases of Sub-acute Bacterial Endocarditis" (1944, with Martin Henry Dawson and Gladys L. Hobby)
- "Antistreptolysin titers in cases of filariasis with recurrent lymphangitis among military personnel" (1945, with Harry M. Rose and James T. Culbertson)
- "Differential Agglutination of Normal and Sensitized Sheep Erythrocytes by Sera of Patients with Rheumatoid Arthritis" (1948, with Harry M. Rose, Charles Ragan, and Elizabeth Pearce)
- "Changes in the bacterial flora of the throat and intestinal tract during prolonged oral administration of penicillin" (1948, with James A. Coss Jr. and Ralph H. Boots)
