= Lipmann =

Lipmann is a surname. Notable people with the surname include:

- Alexander Lipmann-Kessel (1914–1986), orthopaedic surgeon
- Fritz Albert Lipmann (1899–1986), German-American biochemist
- Yom-Tov Lipmann Heller (1578–1654), Bohemian rabbi
- Yom-Tov Lipmann-Muhlhausen (fl. 1400), controversialist, Talmudist, kabalist and philosopher

== See also ==
- Lippmann
- Lippman
- Liebmann
