= Geneticization =

Tendency to define differences between individuals as largely or entirely due to genetics

Geneticization is a term that has been widely used by critics of genetic medicine since the early 1990s. Originally coined by Abby Lippman in a series of three papers published in the 1990s (specifically in 1991, 1992, and 1994), geneticization refers to the increasing tendency to define differences between individuals as largely or entirely due to genetics. This includes the growing framing and understanding of human diseases and behaviors in genetic terms. Henk A. M. J. ten Have has defined geneticization as "...a heuristic tool that can help to re-focus the moral debate on the implications of new genetic knowledge towards interpersonal relations, the power of medicine, the cultural context and social constraints, rather than emphasizing issues as personal autonomy and individual rights."

It is common for social scientists and bioethicists to argue that geneticization leads to a growing belief in genetic determinism and essentialism in the general public, and that this, in turn, increases discrimination, stigma, and inequality. When Lippman originally coined the term "geneticization", for example, she was concerned about the potential for geneticization to increase public belief in biological essentialism, thereby reinforcing racism and discrimination against people with disabilities. Some proponents of the heuristic of geneticization also argue that the media's coverage of genetics contributes to geneticization. However, the empirical evidence on the link between geneticization and genetic determinism, and between genetic determinism, discrimination and inequality, is ambiguous, suggesting that the phenomenon of geneticization may not always follow the simple pattern that proponents of the concept ascribe to it.
