= Gladys Lounsbury Hobby =

American scientist (1910–1993)

- Born: 19 November 1910; New York City, United States
- Died: 4 July 1993 (aged 82); Pennsylvania, United States
- Education: Vassar College (B.S., 1931); Columbia University (Ph.D, 1935)
- Scientific career
- Fields: Microbiology, Medicine

Gladys Lounsbury Hobby (November 19, 1910 – July 4, 1993), born in New York City, was an American microbiologist whose research played a key role in the development and understanding of antibiotics. Her work took penicillin from a laboratory experiment to a mass-produced drug during World War II.

== Early life and education ==
Hobby was born in the Washington Heights neighborhood in New York City, one of two daughters of Theodore Y. Hobby and Flora R. Lounsbury. Her mother taught in the New York public schools system, and her father was a close associate of the philanthropist and collector, Benjamin Altman. Theodore eventually oversaw the Benjamin Altman collection in the Metropolitan Museum of Art. After attending high school in White Plains, New York, Hobby graduated from Vassar College in 1931 with a degree in chemistry. She earned her Ph.D. in bacteriology from Columbia University in 1935. She wrote her doctoral thesis on the medical uses of nonpathogenic organisms.

== Career ==
Hobby worked for Presbyterian Hospital and the Columbia Medical School from 1934 to 1943, where she joined a research team at Columbia College of Physicians and Surgeons that was researching potential human uses for penicillin. The drug was first discovered in 1928 by the Scottish physician and bacteriologist Alexander Fleming. For her research she started to grow penicillin in sizable amounts with her colleagues Dr. Karl Meyer, a biochemist, and Dr. Martin Henry Dawson, a clinician and associate professor of medicine. Together they worked on determining diseases caused by hemolytic streptococci and later on refining penicillin. During this time, Hobby also worked for Presbyterian Hospital in New York City. Hobby left Columbia University in 1944 after Dawson's death to work for Pfizer Pharmaceuticals in New York where she researched streptomycin and other antibiotics.

In 1959, Hobby left Pfizer to specialize in chronic infectious diseases as chief of research at the Veterans Administration Hospital in East Orange, New Jersey. There she also worked on topics including bacteriophages, bacterial variation and enzymes, streptococci, chemotherapy of infectious diseases, immunizing agents, and germ-free life. She also served as an assistant clinical research professor in public health for 18 years at Cornell University Medical College. In 1963 Hobby became the president of the New York Tuberculosis Association; the first woman to hold that title. Additionally, she was an honorary member of the American Society for Microbiology, the American Lung Association, and the American Thoracic Society. In 1972 she founded the monthly publication, Antimicrobial Agents and Chemotherapy, and continued to edit it for eight years. She retired from her main career in 1977. In retirement Hobby wrote over 200 articles, working as a consultant and freelance science writer. She also published a book, Penicillin: Meeting the Challenge, in 1985, in which she described penicillin's journey from the laboratory to factories. She stressed the urgency of penicillin's journey and compared it to the Manhattan project in its importance to the war effort.

Hobby died of a heart attack on July 4, 1993, at her home in the Crosslands retirement community in Kennett Square, Pa. She was 82 years old when she died.

== Key contributions and impact ==
Hobby is recognized for her work in creating a form of penicillin that was effective on human hosts. In 1940, Hobby and her colleagues, Dr. Karl Meyer and Dr. Martin Henry Dawson, wrote to Howard Florey and Ernst Chain to procure a sample of penicillin. They naively decided to make some penicillin and soon became experts in the fermentation process, and began refining it into a drug. Hobby, Meyer, and Dawson performed the first tests of penicillin on humans in 1940 and 1941, before presenting at the American Society for Clinical Investigation. They discovered that penicillin was a powerful germ-killer that reduced the severity of infectious diseases and made procedures such as organ transplantation and open-heart surgery possible. Their findings received media coverage, which helped attract funding from the United States Government to mass-produce penicillin during World War II, saving the lives of many soldiers.

At Pfizer, Hobby did extensive early work on Terramycin and Viomycin, used for the treatment of tuberculosis. As a specialist in antimicrobial therapy, she was among the first to research how these drugs worked in the human body.

== Bibliography ==
- Antimicrobial Agents and Chemotherapy (Editor), Journal (1972 - 1980)
- Primary Drug Resistance - Continuing Study of Drug Resistance in a Veteran Population within the United States, American Review of Respiratory Diseases 110, Number 1 (1974)
- Penicillin: Meeting the Challenge, Yale University Press (1985)
- "The Drug That Changed the World", Journal of the College of Physicians & Surgeons of Columbia University Volume 25, Number 1 (Winter 2005)
