= Barry Liebmann =

American comedy writer

- Born: December 4, 1953
- Died: September 1, 2017 (aged 63) Bronx, New York, U.S.
- Area: Writer

Barry Liebmann (December 4, 1953 – September 1, 2017) was a comedy writer whose work appeared in the pages of MAD Magazine for 38 years. Liebmann's subject matter was eclectic, ranging from sports to parental cliches to Harry Potter to cell phones to the Bible, but he wrote dozens of pointed Mad articles focusing on American politics.

He also worked for Looney Tunes comics. In addition, he was an actor, appearing regularly with The Play's the Thing Theatre Company, Living Legends Radio Theatre, and with The NoName Players as "Beloved Intern Barry."

== Personal life and career ==
Barry Liebmann was born in New York City, to Norbert and Dora Liebmann. His parents had left Germany and Austria after the 2nd World War started, while the U.S. was still neutral and limiting refugees. They lived in Washington Heights amongst other German Jewish prewar refugees and had a daughter named Eleanor in addition to Liebmann. Eleanor died in 1974. Liebmann lived in the same apartment in Washington Heights all his life. He attended Queens College, graduating with a bachelor's degree, and studied acting at HB studios.

Liebmann wrote for MAD Magazine for almost 40 years, selling his first piece to them in 1979. He also wrote for DC Comics' Looney Tunes and had pieces published in the NY Daily News, the New York Times, and the Wall Street Journal. He performed in many theater groups including The Play’s the Thing Theatre Company, Instant Shakespeare, the No Name Players (as "Beloved Intern Barry") and Living Legends Radio Theater; and acted in plays including Uncle Vanya, The Comedy of Errors, Our Town and A Night in Elsinore.
