= Lippmann =

Lippmann is a German surname. Notable people with the surname include:

- Alexandre Lippmann (1881–1960), French Olympic champion fencer
- Bernard Lippmann, American physicist, known for the Lippmann–Schwinger equation
- Edmund Oscar von Lippmann (1857–1940), German chemist
- Frank Lippmann (born 1961), German footballer
- Horst Lippmann (1927–1997), German jazz musician
- Gabriel Lippmann (1845–1921), physicist, inventor, and Nobel laureate in physics
  - Lippmann (crater), on the Moon, is named after Gabriel Lippmann
  - a Lippmann plate is a clear glass plate in early photography
  - a Lippmann electrometer is a device for detecting small rushes of electric current, invented by Gabriel Lippmann in 1873
- Julie M. Lippmann (1864–1952), American writer
- Julius Lippmann (1864–1934), German liberal politician
- Karl Friedrich Lippmann (1883–1957), German painter
- Léontine Lippmann (1844–1910), French salon hostess
- Lorna Lippmann (1921–2004), Australian anthropologist and campaigner for the rights of Aboriginal Australians
- Thomas Lippmann (born 1961), German politician
- Valentin Lippmann (born 1991), German politician
- Walter Lippmann (1889–1974), American writer, journalist, and political commentator
  - a "lipmann" is a variety of journalist in Stranger in a Strange Land, named for Walter Lippmann
  - Colloque Walter Lippmann was a 1938 conference of intellectuals organized in Paris by philosopher Louis Rougie
- Walter Max Lippmann (1919–1993), German-born Jewish community leader and advocate of multiculturalism in Australia

== See also ==
- Lipmann
- Lippman
- Lipman
- Liebmann
