= Heinrich Liepmann =

German-British political economist

Heinrich Liepmann (August 3, 1904 – October 3, 1983 in Caterham, Surrey) was a German-British Political economist.

== Personal and professional life ==
Liepmann was born in Stettin and the son of a bank director. His elder brother, Leo Liepmann, was an economist. After attending Gymnasium in Jena, where he took school leaving exams in 1923, he studied German, philosophy, modern history and political economy simultaneously at the University of Jena. In his leisure time he worked at an academic book dealer. His teachers at Jena included, among others, Emil Lederer and Alfred Weber, and he heard their lectures on political economy.

In the summer term of 1925 Liepmann moved to Heidelberg, where, aside from replacing German with sociology, he continued with the same subject specialisms. In 1931 he submitted his dissertation, supervised by von Weber, on Economy and Revolution in Germany in 1848, and was awarded Dr. rer. oec. (comparable with a PhD in Economics), with a summa cum laude commendation. During his studies in Heidelberg, Liepmann founded the Akademischdemokratische Studentengruppe (Democratic Student Group) which was closely allied with the DDP, and led it from 1926 till 1929.

Liepmann spent the summer term of 1932 on a post-doctoral scholarship at the Graduate Institute of International and Development Studies in Geneva after which he returned to Heidelberg, where until 1934 he worked as a research assistant under von Weber in the research programme supported by the Rockefeller Foundation on "Zum wirtschaftlichen Schicksal Europas" ("Concerning the Economic Fate of Europe").

In 1936 Liepmann moved to the UK, on account of growing harassment connected with his Jewish origins. In 1938 he published his only book on political economics, a comprehensive quantitative and comparative study of the development of customs tariffs in the principal European trading nations, and their economic effects. Given the growing protectionism shortly before and during the Great Depression, which provided rich data for the period between 1927 and 1931, the work attracted considerable interest, and was discussed in British periodicals. In order to compare average increases in customs tariffs in various countries, Liepmann chose a notional 'sample list' of goods, rather than using actual country-specific goods and quantities, and used it to calculate 'potential tariff levels'. He demonstrated, using statistical material, that tariffs for all product categories, and in particular for agricultural produce, had risen sharply in the five years following the failed World Economic Conference of 1927, and he was a critic of British protectionism.

The Nazi police authorities classified Liepmann as an enemy of the state after his emigration. In early 1940 the Reich Security Main Office added him to The Black Book, an index of persons who, in the event of a successful invasion of Britain by the German army, were to be found and arrested as a matter of high priority by SS Commandos who would follow the occupying forces.

In early 1940 Liepmann was offered research funding at Queen's University in Kingston, Ontario, but was unable to take it up owing to his internment by the British authorities in May 1940 as an enemy alien. Following his release in February 1941, he was unable to obtain either a visa or an ocean passage to Canada to take up the position. In 1942 he received a scholarship to work at the Royal Institute of International Affairs/Chatham House in Cambridge; then from April to September 1943 he was employed for his linguistic skills as a monitor by the BBC.

From January 1944 Liepmann was a German teacher at the County Grammar School for Boys (now Langley Park School for Boys) in Beckenham, Kent.

== Publications ==
- Wirtschaft und Revolution 1848 in Deutschland. Ökonomie und soziologische Beiträge zur Geschichte ihrer wechselseitigen Beziehungen, 1931.
- Tariff Levels and the Economic Unity of Europe. An Examination of Tariff Policy, Export Movements and the Economic Integration of Europe, 1913–1931, (Translated by H. Stenning, Introduction by Sir Walter Layton), Allan & Unwin, London 1938. (reprint: Philadelphia 1980)
- Erinnerungen an Karl Jaspers aus den Jahren 1925–1936, in: Klaus Piper, Hans Saner (ed.): Erinnerungen an Karl Jaspers, Piper, Munich/Zürich 1974, S. [47]–52.
