= John Elmer McKeen =

John Elmer McKeen (1903 – 1978) was a pioneering chemical engineer known globally for his contributions to mass production of antibiotics, particularly penicillin, during World War II. His contributions led to the rapid scale-up of production, supplying a substantial portion of this vital "miracle antibiotic" to the armed forces. McKeen graduated from Brooklyn Polytechnic Institute (now NYU Polytechnic School of Engineering) in 1926 as a chemical engineer and immediately went to work for Pfizer, where he was the president from 1949 to 1965. He was an elected member of the National Academy of Engineering.
