= Martin Henry Dawson =

Canadian medical researcher

- Born: 6 August 1896; Truro, Nova Scotia
- Died: 27 April 1945 (aged 48); New York
- Education: Dalhousie University, McGill University (M.D. 1923)
- Known for: Penicillin therapy, treatment of arthritis
- Relatives: John Barnhill Dickie (grandfather)
- Scientific career
- Fields: Infectious diseases
- Workplaces: Royal Victoria Hospital, Montreal; Rockefeller Institute, Columbia University

Martin Henry Dawson (6 August 1896 – 27 April 1945) was a Canadian researcher who made important contributions in the fields of infectious diseases.

Dawson was born in Truro, Nova Scotia, a grandson of John Barnhill Dickie and educated at Dalhousie University and McGill University. His research included studies on the transformation of pneumococci and on the biological variants of the streptococcus and other microorganisms. Dawson's studies on the nature and treatment of arthritis made him a recognized authority in this disorder. He was a pioneer in penicillin therapy, and was the first in the world to prepare it and use it in human disease. This included the successful treatment of bacterial endocarditis with penicillin, and the use of gold salts in the treatment of rheumatoid arthritis.

Dawson became the first person in history to administer an antibiotic (penicillin) to a patient, on October 16, 1940.

== Military career ==
After he had graduated Dalhousie University in Halifax with a BA in 1916 he started serving in the Canadian forces in the First World War. Pte. M. Henry Dawson was with No. 7 Stationary Hospital at La Harve, France. He became a Capt. in the Nova Scotia Reg’t of Canadian Army Medical Corps. He was wounded in 1917 and again in 1918 and was awarded the Military Cross in 1917.

== Career as a researcher ==
Following the war Dawson attended McGill University in Quebec and received his M.D. degree in 1923. After graduating in Medicine he worked at the Royal Victoria Hospital in Montreal. In 1926 he was appointed a National Research Fellow, assigned to the Rockefeller Institute in New York.

As a National Research Council fellow he worked with Oswald Avery at the Rockefeller Institute. Over Avery's strong objections, Dawson recreated Fred Griffith's discovery that a soluble substance from dead bacteria of one type can effect a repeatable and inheritable change in bacteria of another type – a process Dawson termed transformation in his six articles on the subject – in which he was the first person in history to put the substance to work in a test tube and even to partially extract it. The phrase stuck and eventually Avery along with Colin Munro MacLeod proved the substance was in fact DNA.

In 1929 Dawson became associated with the Presbyterian Hospital and the Department of Medicine at Columbia University.

In 1942 Dawson became the victim of myasthenia gravis, a chronic progressively disabling disease. He died in 1945 at Columbia University Medical Center.

== Career ==
- 1916 B.A. Dalhousie University
- 1923 M.D., C.M. McGill University
- 1923-1924 Demonstrator in Pathology and Bacteriology, McGill University. Externe in Pathology, Royal Victoria Hospital
- 1924-1925 Instructor in Pathology and Bacteriology, University of Louisville
- 1925-1926 Assistant Resident Physician, Royal Victoria Hospital
- 1926-1928 National Research Council Fellow in Medicine. Rockefeller Institute
- 1928-1929 Assistant, Rockefeller Institute
- 1929-1930 Associate in Medicine, College of Physicians and Surgeons
- 1929- Assistant Attending Physician, Presbyterian Hospital
- 1930- Assistant Professor of Medicine, College of Physicians and Surgeons

== Publications ==
- "Variation in the Hemolytic Streptococci" (1938, with Gladys L. Hobby and Miriam Olmstead)
- Penicillin Sensitivity of Strains of Non-hemolytic Streptococci Isolated from Gases of Sub-acute Bacterial Endocarditis" (1944, with Gladys L. Hobby and Miriam O. Lipman)
- "The Clinical Use Of Penicilin: Observations in One Hundred Cases" (1944, with Gladys L. Hobby)
- "The Treatment of Subacute Bacterial Endocarditis with Penicillin" (1945, with Thomas H. Hunter)
