= Abby Lippman =

Canadian feminist and epidemiologist

- Born: December 11, 1939; Brooklyn, New York, United States
- Died: December 26, 2017 (aged 78); Montreal, Quebec, Canada
- Education: Cornell University; McGill University
- Known for: Women's health
- Scientific career
- Fields: Epidemiology
- Institutions: McGill University
- Thesis: Genetic counseling: parents' response to uncertainty (1978)

Abby Lippman (December 11, 1939 – December 26, 2017) was a Canadian feminist and epidemiologist who served as a professor in the Department of Epidemiology, Biostatistics and Occupational Health at McGill University. She was known for her advocacy for human rights and women's health, and for her research applying a feminist perspective to biotechnology and pharmaceutical drugs. Among her most notable works were her critiques of hormone replacement therapy, the pharmaceutical industry, the HPV vaccine, and the "geneticization" of reproductive technologies. In 2001, Lippmann helped the Center for Genetics and Society (CGS) to continue their efforts to bring social justice on human biotechnology.

== Education ==
Abby Lippman studied for Comparative Literature at Cornell University in New York where she got her BA.

In 1973 she moved to Montreal to study at McGill university and got her PhD in Human Genetics. She was highly involved in political issues relating women's health as well as her studies of applied in genetic technologies.

== Activities ==
Lippman gave her first professional presentation in 1975 when she participated in the March of Dimes-Birth Defects Conference in San Francisco, United States.
