= Karl Meyer (biochemist) =

German biochemist (1899–1990)

Karl Meyer (4 September 1899 – 18 May 1990) was a German biochemist. He worked on connective tissue and determined the properties of hyaluronan in the 1930s.

== Biography ==
Meyer was born on 4 September 1899 in Kerpen, Germany. He studied medicine and received his Ph.D. from the University of Cologne in 1924. He moved to Berlin and received a Ph.D. in chemistry from the Kaiser Wilhelm Society in 1927.

In 1930, Herbert Evans invited Meyer to work as assistant professor at the University of California, Berkeley.

He then moved to New York and worked at Columbia University, doing research on hyaluronan.

From 1967 to 1976, Meyer was a professor of Biochemistry at Yeshiva University in New York City before returning to Columbia University as an emeritus professor.

A resident of Teaneck, New Jersey, Meyer died at the age of 90 on 18 May 1990, at a nursing home in nearby Cresskill.

== Awards ==
- 1956 Albert Lasker Award for Basic Medical Research
- 1965 Member of the American Academy of Arts and Sciences
- 1967 Member of the National Academy of Sciences

== Legacy ==
The Society for Complex Carbohydrates (now Society for Glycobiology) has presented the Karl Meyer Award since 1991.
