= Fleming College (disambiguation) =

Fleming College is a college in Peterborough, Ontario, Canada.

Fleming College may also refer to:

- Fleming College Toronto, a private college founded in 2022.
- Sir Alexander Fleming College in Trujillo, Perú
- Fleming College Florence, founded in Switzerland in 1968, relocated to Florence, Italy in 1972
