= George Kollias (biologist) =

Greek immunologist (born 1958)

- Born: 9 November 1958 (age 67); Athens, Greece
- Known for: Research on Tumor necrosis factor
- Awards: (1993) First International Bodossaki Foundation Award, (2013) Member of the Academy of Athens, (2014) Carol Nachman Prize for Rheumatology, (2015) Prix Galien Scientific Research Award
- Scientific career
- Fields: Biology, immunology
- Workplaces: BSRC Alexander Fleming, Athens University Medical School

George Kollias (Greek: Γιώργος Κόλλιας; born 9 November 1958 in Athens) is a Greek biologist, Member of the Academy of Athens and Professor of Physiology at the Medical School of the National and Kapodistrian University of Athens. He is renowned for providing the preclinical rationale for the development of anti-TNF therapies for rheumatoid arthritis. His research is highly cited for discovering disease pathways in animal models of chronic inflammation and autoimmunity (e.g. rheumatoid arthritis, inflammatory bowel disease and multiple sclerosis). His lab has made pioneering discoveries on the pivotal role of fibroblasts in pathophysiology, instigating a new field opening therapeutic opportunities for chronic inflammation and fibrotic diseases. He is credited with the development of major national infrastructures of scientific and technological excellence in Greece, such as InfrafrontierGR and pMedGR. He is Founder and President of BIOMEDCODE HELLAS SA, a CRO offering preclinical drug evaluation services. He is also Founder and Director of INOLYSIS, a company developing novel therapeutics against chronic inflammation and fibrosis.

== Education and employment ==
George Kollias graduated from the Biology Department of the University of Athens, Greece and performed doctoral studies in Molecular Biology from 1980 to 1984 at the National Hellenic Research Foundation. He continued with postdoctoral research in the field of gene structure and expression at the Laboratory of Gene Structure and Expression, National Institute for Medical Research, Mill Hill, London, UK, and from 1990 to 2000 he established the Laboratory of Molecular Genetics at the Hellenic Pasteur Institute in Athens, Greece. From 2000 to 2002, he was appointed Director of the Institute for Immunology at the Biomedical Sciences Research Center "Alexander Fleming", and has served as the center's president and Scientific Director (2002–2010 & 2016–2020). Since June 2014, he is Professor of Experimental Physiology at the Medical School of the National and Kapodistrian University of Athens. From 2020 to 2023 he served as Director of the Department of Physiology.

== Research and innovation ==
In 1991, George Kollias' group was first to provide in vivo, proof of principle studies, on deregulated TNF production being causal to the development of chronic polyarthritis in a transgenic animal model, and for showing originally that anti-huTNF antibody treatment was efficacious in treating the modeled disease (pg. 370). These studies were instrumental in mobilizing the interest of anti-TNF industry and foreshadowed the success of the first clinical trials performed in RA in 1994. Further work in his lab provided insights into the function of TNF in host defense and the structure and function of secondary lymphoid organs, a work that more recently evolved into the establishment of TNFRI and NFkB signals specifically in follicular dendritic cells (FDCs) being of pivotal significance in the regulation of humoral B cell responses and autoimmunity. Moreover, George Kollias' group demonstrated TNF's causal effect in the development of combined Crohn's disease and polyarthritis, and the contribution of transmembrane versus soluble TNF in the pathogenic processes. These studies offered a better understanding of the physiological function of TNF in health and disease and rationalized potential complications or optimizations of anti-TNF therapies in other diseases such as in MS. More recently, George Kollias introduced a novel pathogenic principle to explain the cellular basis of TNF function in gut/joint axis diseases, including spondyloarthropathies, by showing that mesenchymal cells, namely synovial fibroblasts and intestinal subepithelial myofibroblasts, are common pathogenic targets of TNF sufficient to drive the chronic inflammatory and destructive disease process. ] This pioneering research and findings offered the first in vivo evidence that fibroblasts activated by innate signals provide a dominant mechanism for the orchestration of complex pathologies such as chronic inflammation and fibrosis, and their deactivation may offer significant therapeutic potential. Animal models developed in his lab have been distributed to numerous academic and industrial laboratories around the world (over 200 Material Transfer Agreements in the last ten years). In 2005 he founded the first CRO-biotech spin-off of BSRC Fleming, Biomedcode Hellas SA and in 2025 he founded INOLYSIS, a company developing novel drug candidates against fibrosis.

== Distinctions ==
George Kollias is placed amongst the top cited European scientists in Rheumatology research for the period 1997 to 2008. He has published over 230 primary research articles in peer-reviewed journals and more than 50 reviews and commentaries. His work has received over 49.000 citations and an h-index of 100 (data from Google Scholar). His laboratory is supported by several competitive grants from European Commission and National sources, as well as by the international biopharmaceutical industry. From 2005 - 2009 Dr. Kollias coordinated a consortium of 24 EU organizations constituting the FP6 Network of Excellence MUGEN ("Functional Genomics in mutant mouse models as tools to investigate the complexity of human immunological disease", 11M€). He was a core member of the Innovative Medicines Initiative (IMI) project BeTheCure (Total budget: 38 M€, 2011–2016)

He has been awarded two Advanced ERC grants: MCs-inTEST(ID: 340217, 2014–2019) highlighting the critical role of mesenchymal cells in intestinal epithelial and immunological homeostasis and BecomingCausal (ID:101055093, 2022–2027) investigating the molecular and cellular mechanisms underlying fibrosis in progressive IBD. In 2025 he was also awarded an ERC Proof of Concept grant to support the development of a novel oral therapy targeting fibroblast-driven inflammation and fibrosis in IBD via his startup company INOLYSIS.

George Kollias is an elected member of the European Molecular Biology Organization (EMBO) since 2000 and Member of the Biosciences Steering Group of the European Academies Science Advisory Panel (EASAC) since 2014. In recognition of eminent scientific discoveries and contributions to science, he was awarded the internationally acclaimed Carol-Nachman Award for Rheumatology in 2014 and the first Galien Scientific Research Award, of Prix Galien Greece in 2015. Dr. Kollias served as the National Representative of Greece for the ESFRI (2010–2012) and as member of the ESFRI strategic working group on Health and Food (2010 to date). George Kollias has been a member of the National Council on Research and Technology of the Ministry of Development (2001–2003 and 2005–2009) and has served as an elected President of the Council of the Directors of the Greek Research Centers (2009–2010). He serves as an advisor for scientific organizations and consults for industry. George Kollias also serves as invited speaker, chairman and member of the Organising and Scientific Committees of several scientific meetings throughout the world. George Kollias is Director of the Graduate Program in "Molecular Biomedicine" at the Medical School of the University of Athens (founded 2016).
