= Kevin Brown (historian) =

British historian

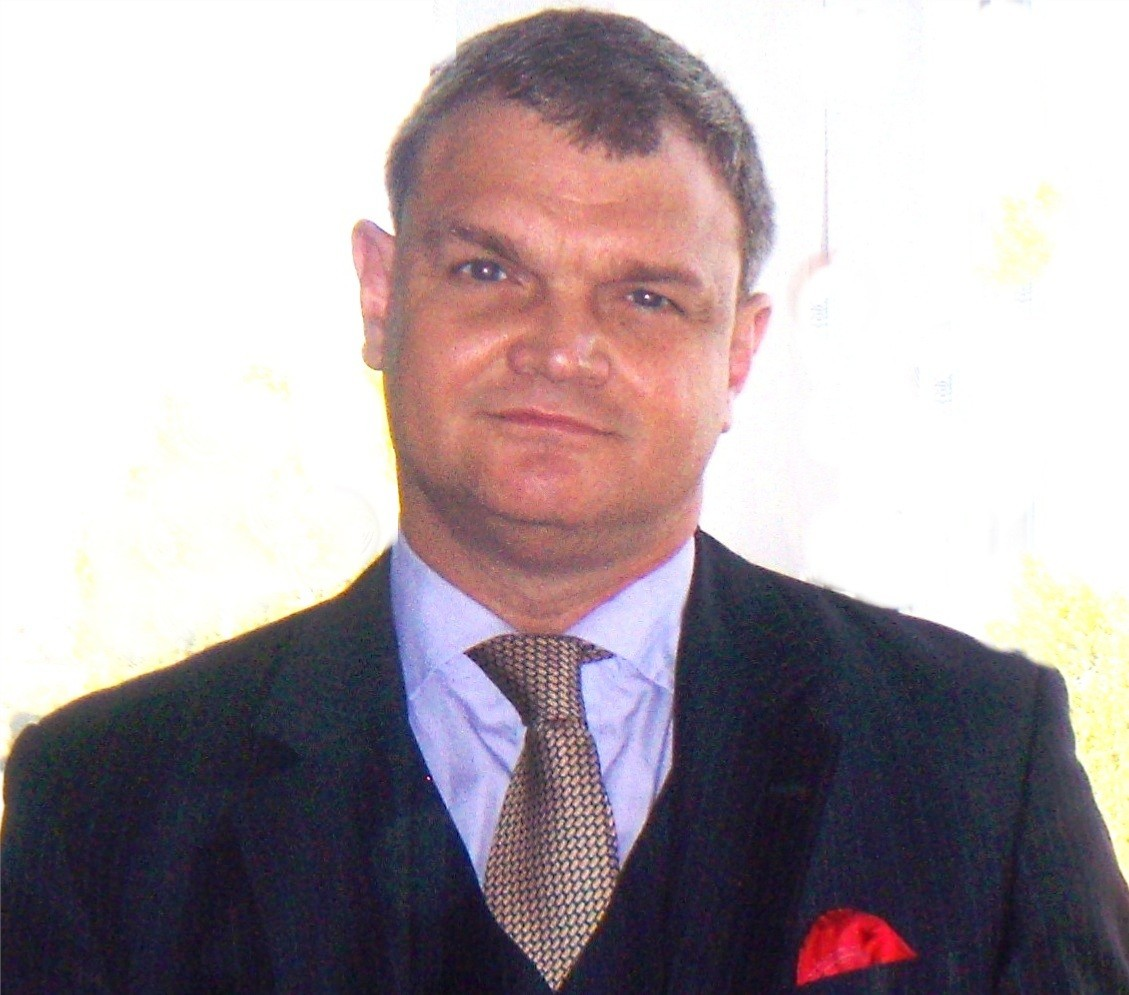
Kevin Brown

Kevin Brown (born 1961) has been Trust Archivist and Alexander Fleming Laboratory Museum Curator at St Mary's NHS Trust, subsequently Imperial College Healthcare NHS Trust, since 1989, having set up the archives service for St Mary's Hospital, Paddington, London, England, in 1989 and having established the museum in 1993.

Brown was educated at Hertford College, Oxford and at University College London. He is a professional archivist and museum curator specialising in the history of medicine and has lectured widely. In 2001, he was the first historian and first non-scientist to deliver the Andrew J. Moyer Lecture at the United States Department of Agriculture National Center for Agricultural Utilization Research at Peoria, Illinois. He was Chairman of the London Museums of Health & Medicine from 2001 to 2004. He is an authority on Alexander Fleming and the history of penicillin.

Brown's 2004 biography of Alexander Fleming, Penicillin Man: Alexander Fleming and the Antibiotic Revolution tells the story of the discovery of penicillin and of the great scientist who made that breakthrough. He has also written a history of syphilis, The Pox: the Life and Near Death of a Very Social Disease in 2006 and has written a study of health, war and military and civilian medicine in the 20th century, published as Fighting Fit: Health Medicine and War in the Twentieth Century in 2008. He has since turned his attention to the history of maritime medicine with Poxed and Scurvied: The Story of Sickness and Health at Sea published in 2011; Passage to the World: The Emigrant Experience in 2013; The Seasick Admiral: Nelson and the Health of the Navy in 2016; and Fittest of the Fit: Health and Morale in the Royal Navy 1939–1945 in 2019.
