= Actors Ensemble of Berkeley =

Community theater company

Actors Ensemble of Berkeley is a community theater company based in Berkeley, California and founded in 1957. As of 2025, Actors Ensemble is the longest-running theatre company in Berkeley. The current schedule is centered around two free productions per year on summer weekend afternoons in the John Hinkel Park amphitheater, the first opening around July 4 and the second finishing on our about Labor Day, plus indoor productions and staged readings as the opportunity arises.

AE (or in later years AEB), began as the result of a streetcorner conversation between George Marchi and Bill Matheson, fellow alumni of U.C. Berkeley, in 1955. This led to further conversations which also included Ernest Landauer, Joseph Landisman, Edward Markmann, Al Stern, and Arnold Wolf, leading to the group incorporating in 1957, achieving non-profit status in 1967. For the first nine years, AE produced dramatic works in schools, churches, private houses, gardens, and at John Hinkel Park. George Marchi later moved to Europe to teach, ultimately landing at Fleming College Florence and helped found the associated American Repertory Theatre, Europe.

AE was founded upon principals taught by University of California, Berkeley Professor Fred Oren Harris and his wife Mary, who contributed to development of what later became the Theatre, Dance, and Performance Studies Department at U.C. Berkeley. The name Actors Ensemble, inspired by this philosophy, came from an ensemble in New York with which Fred Harris was associated in the 1930s.

Early on a frequent performance venue for AE was "The Side Door Theater" in the basement of the home of fellow founder Marjorie Glicksman, later also a founder of Aurora Theatre. Notable early members also included Bill Martinelli, Ralph and Virginia Miller, Donna Davis, Tom Reilly, Robert Sicular, June Levin, Wolfgang Heinritz, Benbow Ritchie, Gilbert Black, and Margaret Gudmundsson and her son Robert.

In 1965 AE began producing plays at Live Oak Theatre, attached to the community center in Live Oak Park, shared with many other groups. In 1978 Proposition 13 was passed in California, reducing the funding available for the City to manage the building. AE contracted with the City of Berkeley to manage Live Oak Theatre for the public. In the 2000s AE began appending the words "of Berkeley" to its name in order to differentiate itself from the nearby and similarly named Diablo Actors Ensemble, most recently of Walnut Creek, CA. The arrangement with the City for the use of Live Oak Theater continued until 2013, when TheatreFirst took over managing the theatre after an open bidding process. The venue is as of 2025 managed by Korsa Musical Theater Company, formerly Youth Musical Theater Company.

In 2013, AE became nomadic, performing in numerous venues, including performances at Live Oak Theater as well as La Val's Subterranean Theater, Berkeley's Old (Red) Finnish Hall, also known as Toveri Tupa, and most prominently in John Hinkel Park where performances have been held in the summers since 2013. Notable contributors in recent years include Stanley Spenger, Jerome Solberg, Vicki Siegel, Jeff Trescott, Michael R. Cohen, Jane Goodwin, Gabriel Ross, Paulette Herring, Jonathan Gordon, Alecks Rundell, Nathan Bogner, Tracy Baxter, and Jay Manley.

In 2019 the City of Berkeley recognized Actors Ensemble's contributions via a proclamation.

This article includes in a condensed form some information from the history published on the AE website.
