= Norman Heatley =

English biologist (1911–2004)

- Born: 10 January 1911; Woodbridge, Suffolk, England
- Died: 5 January 2004 (aged 92); Oxford, England
- Education: Saint Felix School; Westbourne House School; Tonbridge School
- Alma mater: St John's College, Cambridge
- Known for: Penicillin
- Scientific career
- Fields: Biology, biochemistry
- Workplaces: Lincoln College, Oxford University

Norman George Heatley OBE (10 January 1911 – 5 January 2004) was an English biologist and biochemist. He was a member of the team of Oxford University scientists who developed penicillin. Heatley developed the back-extraction technique for efficiently purifying penicillin in bulk.

== Early life ==
He was born in Woodbridge, Suffolk, and as a boy was an enthusiastic sailor of a small boat on the River Deben, an experience which gave him a lifelong love of sailing. He attended school at Westbourne House in Folkestone, followed by Tonbridge School, then went on to St John's College, Cambridge, where he studied Natural Sciences, graduating in 1933. His doctoral research in Cambridge led to a PhD in 1936, and he then moved to the University of Oxford, where he became a fellow of Lincoln College and joined a team working under Howard Florey that included Ernst Chain.

== Production problem ==
Alexander Fleming had first discovered penicillin by accident in 1928, but at that time believed it had little application. When Florey and his team recognised the potential of the discovery for combating bacterial infection, they faced the problem of how to manufacture penicillin in sufficient quantities to be of use. Heatley, although the junior member of the team, possessed a natural gift for ingenuity and invention. It was he who suggested transferring the active ingredient of penicillin back into water by changing its acidity, thus purifying the penicillin.

Heatley recorded these trials, carried out on eight mice in May 1940, in his diary:

"After supper with some friends, I returned to the lab and met the professor to give a final dose of penicillin to two of the mice. The 'controls' were looking very sick, but the two treated mice seemed very well. I stayed at the lab until 3:45 a.m., by which time all four control animals were dead."

On returning home, he realised that in haste and darkness, he had put his underpants on back to front, and noted this in his diary too, adding "It really looks as if penicillin may be of practical importance." In order to conduct tests on human patients, even more of the drug had to be produced, and again it was Heatley who realised that the most effective vessel for this purpose was something like the porcelain bedpans in use at the Radcliffe Infirmary. These were in short supply because the ongoing World War II, so Heatley designed a modified version which was manufactured in the Potteries. With the help of these, the Oxford laboratory became the first penicillin factory, and subsequent tests on humans proved the efficacy of the new treatment. Even so, it was very difficult to produce enough for sustained treatment.

== Trials on humans ==
In December 1940, a 43-year-old police constable, Albert Alexander, was accidentally scratched by a rose thorn on his mouth and was succumbing to septicaemia. Alexander was admitted to the Radcliffe Infirmary, where various conventional treatments all failed, and his case was brought to Florey and Heatley's attention. Having previously tried penicillin only on mice, Heatley was concerned about the side effects large doses of penicillin might have. A patient in a terminal condition with nothing to lose was needed as a human volunteer, and Constable Alexander met this requirement. On 12 February 1941, Alexander was given an intravenous infusion of 160 mg (200 units) of penicillin. Within 24 hours, Alexander's temperature had dropped, his appetite had returned and the infection had begun to subside. However, owing to the instability of penicillin and the wartime restrictions placed on Howard Florey's Laboratory, only a small quantity was available, and although Florey and colleagues extracted any remaining penicillin from Alexander's urine, they had run out by the fifth day and Alexander died a month later. Florey and his team thereafter decided to work only on sick children, who did not need such large doses of penicillin, until their methods of production improved.

== Illinois and New Jersey ==
Eventually, Heatley and Florey travelled to the United States in 1941 because they wanted to produce about one kilogram of pure penicillin, and persuaded a laboratory in Peoria, Illinois, to develop larger-scale manufacturing of it. In Peoria, Heatley was assigned to work with Dr. A.J. Moyer. Moyer suggested adding corn-steep liquor, a by-product of starch extraction, to the growth medium. With this and other subtle changes, such as using lactose in place of glucose, they were able to push up yields of penicillin to 20 units per millilitre. But their cooperation had become one-sided. Heatley noted, "Moyer had begun not telling me what he was doing."

Florey returned to Oxford that September, but Heatley stayed on in Peoria until December; then for the next six months, he worked at Merck & Co. in Rahway, New Jersey. In July 1942, he returned to Oxford and was soon to learn why Moyer had become so secretive. When he published their research results, he omitted Heatley's name from the paper, despite an original contract which stipulated that any publications should be jointly authored. Fifty years on, Heatley confessed that he was amused, rather than upset, by Moyer's duplicity. Later he was to learn that financial greed had led Moyer to claim all the credit for himself. To have acknowledged Heatley's part of the work would have made it difficult to apply for patents, as he did, with himself as sole inventor.

== Achievement ==
As Sir Henry Harris put it succinctly in 1998:

"Without Fleming, no Chain or Florey; without Florey, no Heatley; without Heatley, no penicillin."

Yet while Fleming, Florey and Chain jointly received the Nobel Prize for their work in 1945, Heatley's contribution was not fully recognized for another 45 years. It was only in 1990 that he was awarded the unusual distinction of an Honorary Doctorate of Medicine from Oxford University, the first given to a non-medic in Oxford's 800-year history. He was appointed an Officer of the Order of the British Empire (OBE) "For services to scientific research", in the 1978 Birthday Honours.

== Final years ==
Heatley died on 5 January 2004 at his home, 12 Oxford Road, Old Marston, near Oxford.

He was cremated in a cardboard coffin after a funeral service at St Nicholas's Church, Marston, on 15 January 2004. Heatley was survived by his wife, Mercy, and four children, Rose, Chris, Jonathan and Tamsin.

== Legacy ==
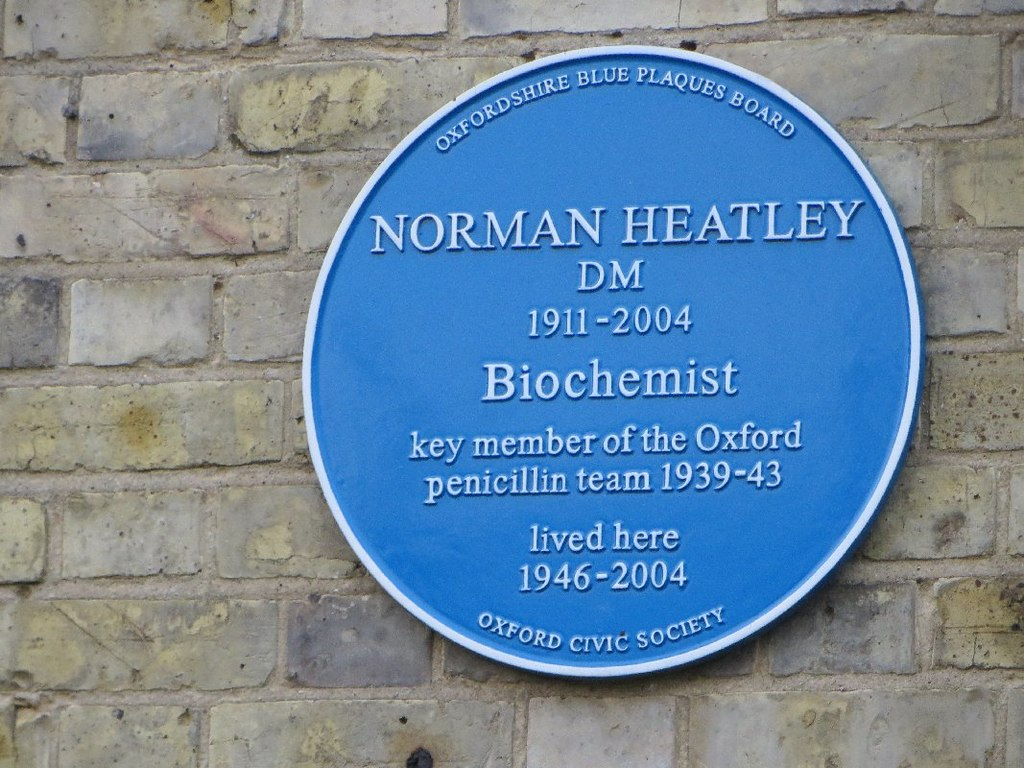
Blue plaque on Heatley's former home

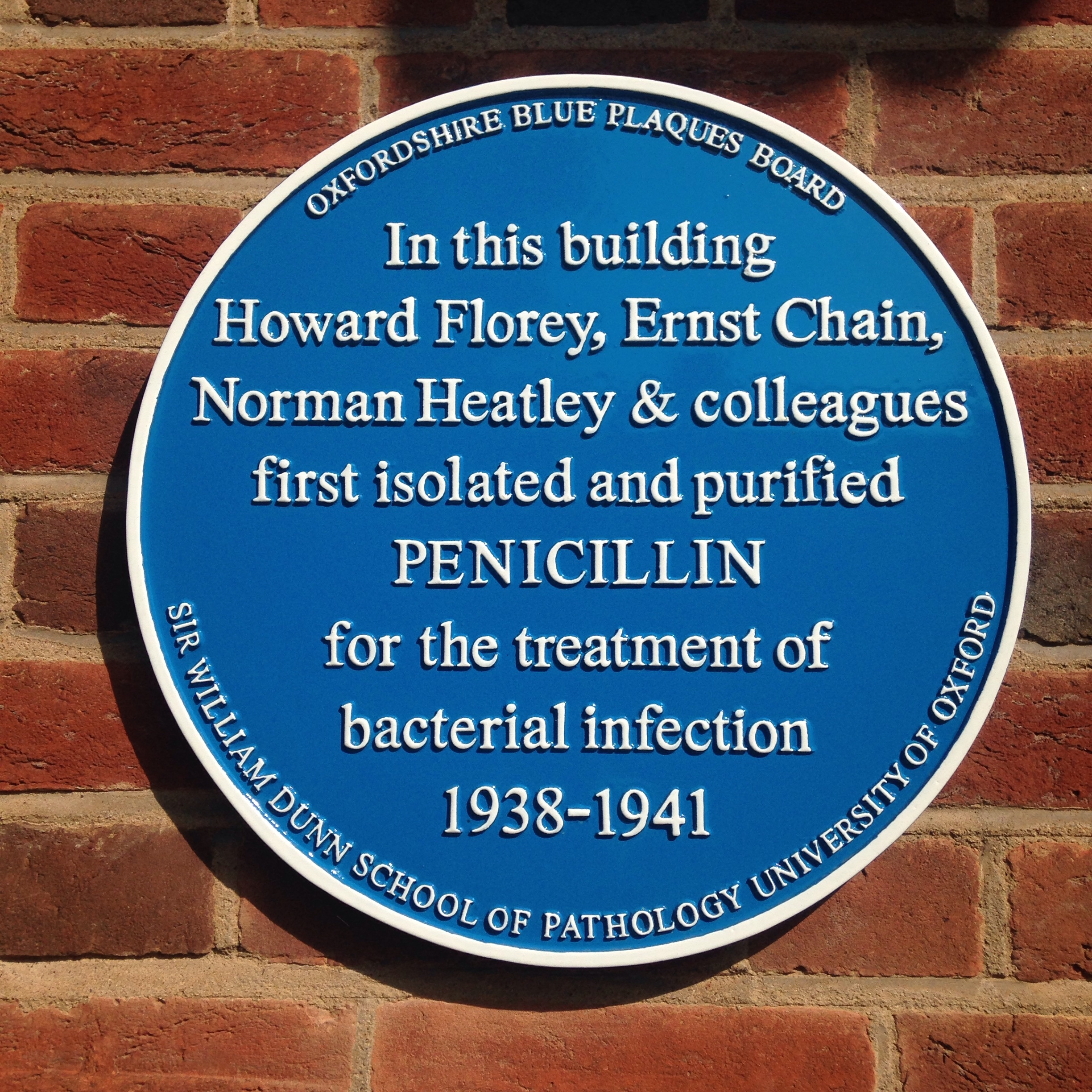
Sir William Dunn School of Pathology building blue plaque

Heatley's former home on Oxford Road now bears a commemorative blue plaque, erected in his honour in 2010 by the Oxfordshire Blue Plaques Board. Heatley is also mentioned alongside Florey and Chain, on another blue plaque, on the Sir William Dunn School of Pathology building on South Parks Road, Oxford.

After Heatley died in 2004, Oxford University established a Norman Heatley Postdoctoral Award for researchers showing excellent ingenuity and problem-solving skills. Heatley's papers are archived within the Wellcome Collection in London.

== Sources ==
- Heatley, Norman George, Oxford Dictionary of National Biography (restricted access)
