= Alexander Fleming =

Scottish physician and microbiologist (1881–1955)

Sir Alexander Fleming FRS FRSE FRCS
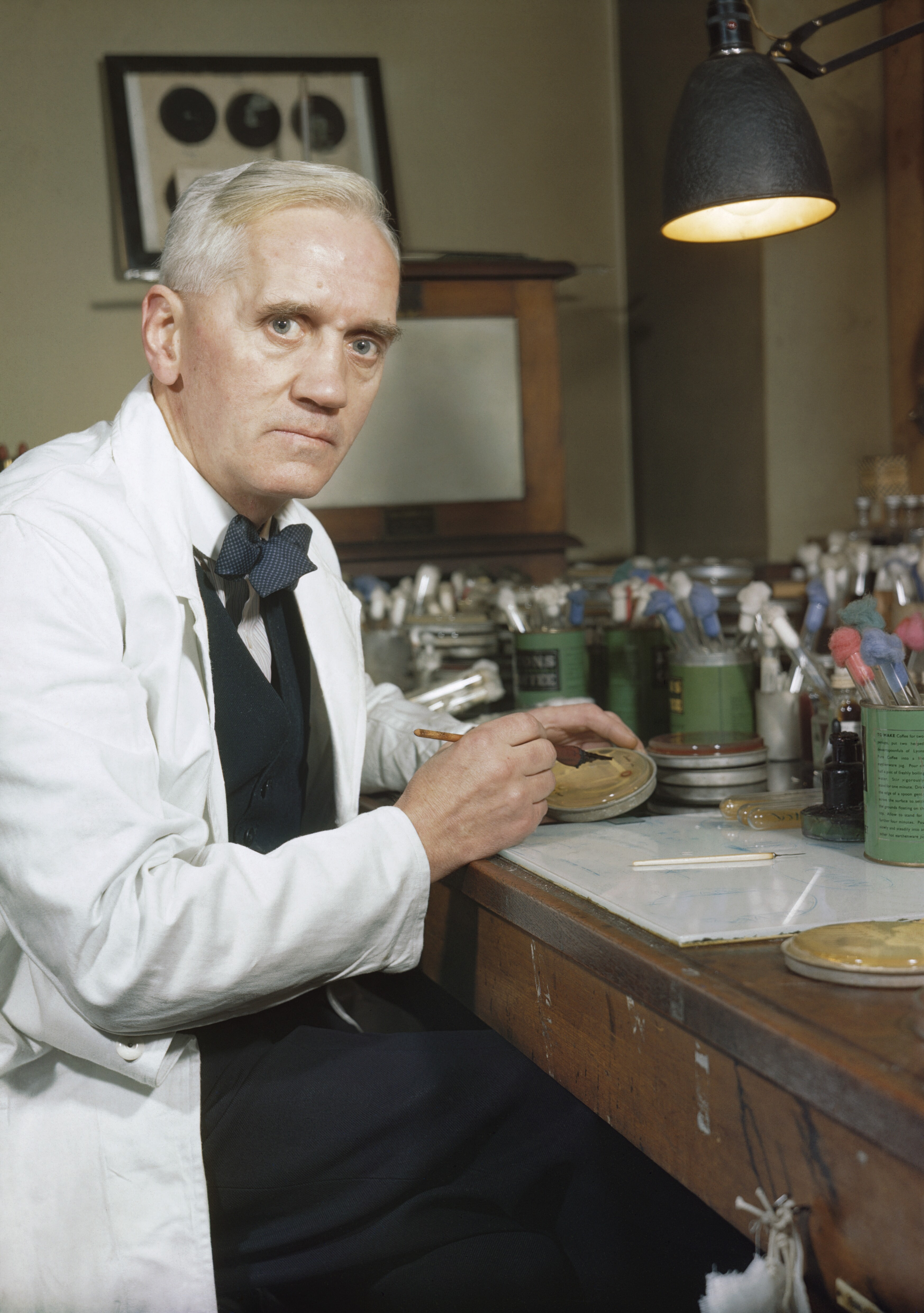
- Fleming in his laboratory, 1943
- Born: 6 August 1881; Darvel, Ayrshire, Scotland
- Died: 11 March 1955 (aged 73); London, England
- Resting place: St Paul's Cathedral
- Education: Royal Polytechnic Institution; St Mary's Hospital Medical School
- Known for: Discovery of penicillin and lysozyme
- Spouses: Sarah Marion McElroy (m. 1915; died 1949) Amalia Koutsouri-Vourekas (m. 1953)
- Awards: Nobel Prize in Physiology or Medicine (1945); Cameron Prize for Therapeutics of the University of Edinburgh (1945); Actonian Prize (1949)
- Scientific career
- Fields: Bacteriology; immunology
- Workplaces: St Mary's Hospital, London

Sir Alexander Fleming (6 August 1881 – 11 March 1955) was a Scottish physician and microbiologist. He shared the 1945 Nobel Prize in Physiology or Medicine with Howard Florey and Ernst Chain "for the discovery of penicillin and its curative effect in various infectious diseases". This was the first antibiotic substance discovered. His discovery in 1928 of what was later named benzylpenicillin (or penicillin G) from the mould Penicillium rubens has been described as the "single greatest victory ever achieved over disease".

He also discovered the enzyme lysozyme from his nasal discharge in 1922, and along with it a bacterium he named Micrococcus lysodeikticus, later renamed Micrococcus luteus.

Fleming was knighted for his scientific achievements in 1944. In 1999, he was named in Time magazine's list of the 100 Most Important People of the 20th century. In 2002, he was included in the BBC's television poll of the 100 Greatest Britons, and in 2009, he was also voted third "greatest Scot" in an opinion poll conducted by STV, behind only Robert Burns and William Wallace.

== Early life and education ==
Born on 6 August 1881 at Lochfield farm near Darvel, in Ayrshire, Scotland, Alexander Fleming was the third of four children of farmer Hugh Fleming and Grace Stirling Morton, the daughter of a neighbouring farmer. Hugh Fleming had four surviving children from his first marriage. He was 59 at the time of his second marriage to Grace, and died when Alexander was seven.

Fleming went to Loudoun Moor School and Darvel School, and earned a two-year scholarship to Kilmarnock Academy before moving to London, where he attended the Royal Polytechnic Institution. After working in a shipping office for four years, the twenty-year-old Alexander Fleming inherited some money from an uncle, John Fleming. His elder brother, Tom, was already a physician and suggested that he should follow the same career. In 1901, the younger Alexander enrolled at St Mary's Hospital Medical School in Paddington, now part of Imperial College London. In 1906, he qualified with an MBBS degree from the school with distinction.

Fleming, who was a private in the London Scottish Regiment of the Volunteer Force from 1900 to 1914, had been a member of the rifle club at the medical school. The captain of the club, wishing to retain Fleming in the team, suggested that he join the research department at St Mary's, where he became assistant bacteriologist to Sir Almroth Wright, a pioneer in vaccine therapy and immunology. In 1908, he gained a BSc degree with gold medal in bacteriology, and became a lecturer at St Mary's until 1914.

Commissioned lieutenant in 1914 and promoted captain in 1917, Fleming served throughout World War I in the Royal Army Medical Corps, and was Mentioned in Dispatches. He and many of his colleagues worked in battlefield hospitals at the Western Front in France.

In 1918 he returned to St Mary's Hospital, where he was elected Professor of Bacteriology of the University of London in 1928.

== Scientific contributions ==
=== Antiseptics ===
During World War I, Fleming with Leonard Colebrook and Sir Almroth Wright joined the war efforts and practically moved the entire Inoculation Department of St Mary's to the British military hospital at Boulogne-sur-Mer. Serving as a temporary lieutenant of the Royal Army Medical Corps, he witnessed the death of many soldiers from sepsis resulting from infected wounds. Antiseptics, which were used at the time to treat infected wounds, he observed, often worsened the injuries.

In a 1917 article published in the medical journal The Lancet, he described an ingenious experiment, which he was able to conduct as a result of his own glassblowing skills, in which he explained why antiseptics were killing more soldiers than infection itself during the war. Antiseptics worked well on the surface, but deep wounds tended to shelter anaerobic bacteria from the antiseptic agent, and antiseptics seemed to remove beneficial agents produced that protected the patients in these cases at least as well as they removed bacteria, and did nothing to remove the bacteria that were out of reach. Wright strongly supported Fleming's findings, but despite this, most army physicians over the course of the war continued to use antiseptics even in cases where this worsened the condition of the patients.

=== Discovery of lysozyme ===
At St Mary's Hospital, Fleming continued his investigations into bacteria culture and antibacterial substances. As his research scholar at the time V. D. Allison recalled, Fleming was not a tidy researcher and usually expected unusual bacterial growths in his culture plates. Fleming had teased Allison of his "excessive tidiness in the laboratory", and Allison rightly attributed such untidiness as the success of Fleming's experiments, and said, "[If] he had been as tidy as he thought I was, he would not have made his two great discoveries."

In late 1921, while Fleming was maintaining agar plates for bacteria, he found that one of the plates was contaminated with bacteria from the air. When he added nasal mucus, he found that the mucus inhibited the bacterial growth. Surrounding the mucus area was a clear transparent circle (1 cm from the mucus), indicating the killing zone of bacteria, followed by a glassy and translucent ring beyond which was an opaque area indicating normal bacterial growth. In the next test, he used bacteria maintained in saline that formed a yellow suspension. Within two minutes of adding fresh mucus, the yellow saline turned completely clear.

He extended his tests using tears, which were contributed by his co-workers. As Allison reminisced, saying, "For the next five or six weeks, our tears were the source of supply for this extraordinary phenomenon. Many were the lemons we used (after the failure of onions) to produce a flow of tears... The demand by us for tears was so great, that laboratory attendants were pressed into service, receiving threepence for each contribution."

His further tests with sputum, cartilage, blood, semen, ovarian cyst fluid, pus, and egg white showed that the bactericidal agent was present in all of these. He reported his discovery before the Medical Research Club in December and before the Royal Society the next year but failed to stir any interest, as Allison recollected:

I was present at this [Medical Research Club] meeting as Fleming's guest. His paper describing his discovery was received with no questions asked and no discussion, which was most unusual and an indication that it was considered to be of no importance. The following year he read a paper on the subject before the Royal Society, Burlington House, Piccadilly and he and I gave a demonstration of our work. Again with one exception little comment or attention was paid to it.

Reporting in the 1 May 1922 issue of the Proceedings of the Royal Society B: Biological Sciences under the title "On a remarkable bacteriolytic element found in tissues and secretions", Fleming wrote:

In this communication I wish to draw attention to a substance present in the tissues and secretions of the body, which is capable of rapidly dissolving certain bacteria. As this substance has properties akin to those of ferments I have called it a "Lysozyme", and shall refer to it by this name throughout the communication. The lysozyme was first noticed during some investigations made on a patient suffering from acute coryza.

This was the first recorded discovery of lysozyme. With Allison, he published further studies on lysozyme in October issue of the British Journal of Experimental Pathology the same year. Although he was able to obtain larger amounts of lysozyme from egg whites, the enzyme was only effective against small counts of harmless bacteria, and therefore had little therapeutic potential. This indicates one of the major differences between pathogenic and harmless bacteria.

Described in the original publication, "a patient suffering from acute coryza" was later identified as Fleming himself. His research notebook dated 21 November 1921 showed a sketch of the culture plate with a small note: "Staphyloid coccus from A.F.'s nose."

He also identified the bacterium present in the nasal mucus as Micrococcus lysodeikticus, giving the species name (meaning "lysis indicator" for its susceptibility to lysozymal activity). The species was reassigned as Micrococcus luteus in 1972. The "Fleming strain" (NCTC2665) of this bacterium has become a model in different biological studies. The importance of lysozyme was not recognised, and Fleming was well aware of this, in his presidential address at the Royal Society of Medicine meeting on 18 October 1932, he said:

I choose lysozyme as the subject for this address for two reasons, firstly because I have a fatherly interest in the name, and, secondly, because its importance in connection with natural immunity does not seem to be generally appreciated.

In his Nobel lecture on 11 December 1945, he briefly mentioned lysozyme, saying, "Penicillin was not the first antibiotic I happened to discover." It was only towards the end of the 20th century that the true importance of Fleming's discovery in immunology was realised as lysozyme became the first antimicrobial protein discovered that constitute part of our innate immunity.

=== Discovery of penicillin ===
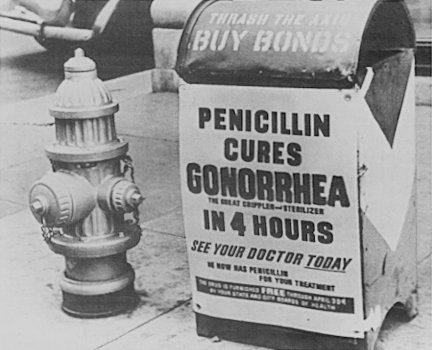
An advertisement advertising penicillin's "miracle cure"

One sometimes finds what one is not looking for. When I woke up just after dawn on September 28, 1928, I certainly didn't plan to revolutionize all medicine by discovering the world's first antibiotic, or bacteria killer. But I suppose that was exactly what I did.

— Alexander Fleming

==== Experiment ====
By 1927, Fleming had been investigating the properties of staphylococci. He was already well known from his earlier work, and had developed a reputation as a brilliant researcher. In 1928, he studied the variation of Staphylococcus aureus grown under natural condition, after the work of Joseph Warwick Bigger, who discovered that the bacterium could grow into a variety of types (strains). On 3 September 1928, Fleming returned to his laboratory having spent a holiday with his family at Suffolk. Before leaving for his holiday, he inoculated staphylococci on culture plates and left them on a bench in a corner of his laboratory.

On his return, Fleming noticed that one culture was contaminated with a fungus, and that the colonies of staphylococci immediately surrounding the fungus had been destroyed, whereas other staphylococci colonies farther away were normal, famously remarking "That's funny". Fleming showed the contaminated culture to his former assistant Merlin Pryce, who reminded him, "That's how you discovered lysozyme." He identified the mould as being from the genus Penicillium. He suspected it to be P. chrysogenum, but a colleague Charles J. La Touche identified it as P. rubrum. It was later corrected as P. notatum and then officially accepted as P. chrysogenum. In 2011, it was resolved as P. rubens.

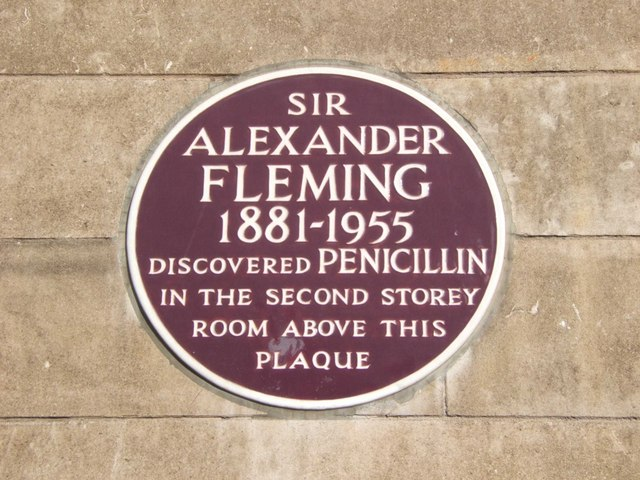
A commemorative plaque marking Fleming's discovery of penicillin at St Mary's Hospital, London

The laboratory in which Fleming discovered and tested penicillin is preserved as the Alexander Fleming Laboratory Museum in St. Mary's Hospital, Paddington. The source of the fungal contaminant was established in 1966 as coming from La Touche's room, which was directly below Fleming's.

Fleming grew the mould in a pure culture and found that the culture broth contained an antibacterial substance. He investigated its anti-bacterial effect on many organisms, and noticed that it affected bacteria such as staphylococci and many other Gram-positive pathogens that cause scarlet fever, pneumonia, meningitis and diphtheria, but not typhoid fever or paratyphoid fever, which are caused by Gram-negative bacteria, for which he was seeking a cure at the time. It also affected Neisseria gonorrhoeae, which causes gonorrhoea, although this bacterium is Gram-negative. After some months of calling it "mould juice" or "the inhibitor", he gave the name penicillin on 7 March 1929 for the antibacterial substance present in the mould.

==== Reception and publication ====
Fleming presented his discovery on 13 February 1929 before the Medical Research Club. His talk on "A medium for the isolation of Pfeiffer's bacillus" did not receive any particular attention or comment. Henry Dale, the then director of National Institute for Medical Research and chair of the meeting, much later reminisced that he did not even sense any striking point of importance in Fleming's speech.

Fleming published his discovery in 1929 in the British Journal of Experimental Pathology, but little attention was paid to the article. His problem was the difficulty of producing penicillin in large amounts, and moreover, isolation of the main compound. Even with the help of Harold Raistrick and his team of biochemists at the London School of Hygiene and Tropical Medicine, chemical purification was futile. "As a result, penicillin languished largely forgotten in the 1930s", as Milton Wainwright described.

As late as in 1936, there was no appreciation for penicillin. When Fleming talked of its medical importance at the Second International Congress of Microbiology held in London, no one believed him. As Allison, his companion in both the Medical Research Club and international congress meeting, remarked the two occasions:

[Fleming at the Medical Research Club meeting] suggested the possible value of penicillin for the treatment of infection in man. Again there was a total lack of interest and no discussion. Fleming was keenly disappointed, but worse was to follow. He read a paper on his work on penicillin at a meeting of the International Congress of Microbiology, attended by the foremost bacteriologists from all over the world. There was no support for his views on its possible future value for the prevention and treatment of human infections and discussion was minimal. Fleming bore these disappointments stoically, but they did not alter his views or deter him from continuing his investigation of penicillin.

In 1941, the British Medical Journal reported that "[Penicillin] does not appear to have been considered as possibly useful from any other point of view."

==== Purification and stabilisation ====
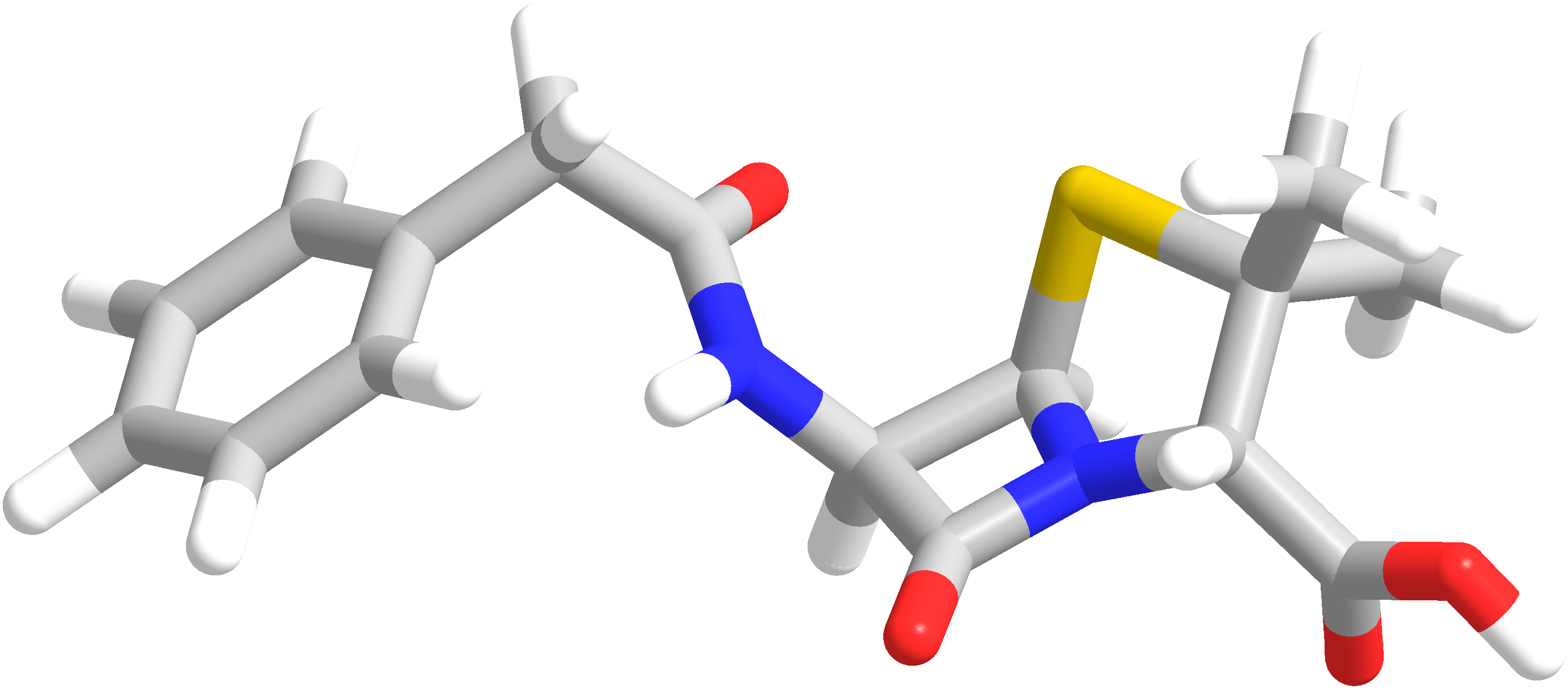
A 3D-model of benzylpenicillin

In Oxford, Ernst Chain and Edward Abraham were studying the molecular structure of the antibiotic. Abraham was the first to propose the correct structure of penicillin. Shortly after the team published its first results in 1940, Fleming telephoned Howard Florey, Chain's head of department, to say that he would be visiting within the next few days. When Chain heard that Fleming was coming, he remarked "Good God! I thought he was dead."

Norman Heatley suggested transferring the active ingredient of penicillin back into water by changing its acidity. This produced enough of the drug to begin testing on animals. There were many more people involved in the Oxford team, and at one point the entire Sir William Dunn School of Pathology was involved in its production. After the team had developed a method of purifying penicillin to an effective first stable form in 1940, several clinical trials ensued, and their amazing success inspired the team to develop methods for mass production and mass distribution in 1945.

Fleming was modest about his part in the development of penicillin, describing his fame as the "Fleming Myth" and he praised Florey and Chain for transforming the laboratory curiosity into a practical drug. Fleming was the first to discover the properties of the active substance, giving him the privilege of naming it: penicillin. He also kept, grew, and distributed the original mould for twelve years, and continued until 1940 to try to get help from any chemist who had enough skill to make penicillin. Sir Henry Harris summed up the process in 1998 as: "Without Fleming, no Chain; without Chain, no Florey; without Florey, no Heatley; without Heatley, no penicillin." The discovery of penicillin and its subsequent development as a prescription drug mark the start of modern antibiotics.

==== Medical use and mass production ====
In his first clinical trial, Fleming treated his research scholar Stuart Craddock who had developed severe infection of the nasal antrum (sinusitis). The treatment started on 9 January 1929 but without any effect. It probably was due to the fact that the infection was with influenza bacillus (Haemophilus influenzae), the bacterium which he had found unsusceptible to penicillin. Fleming gave some of his original penicillin samples to his colleague-surgeon Arthur Dickson Wright for clinical test in 1928. Although Wright reportedly said that it "seemed to work satisfactorily", there are no records of its specific use. Cecil George Paine, a pathologist at the Royal Infirmary in Sheffield and former student of Fleming, was the first to use penicillin successfully for medical treatment. He cured eye infections (conjunctivitis) of one adult and three infants (neonatal conjunctivitis) on 25 November 1930.

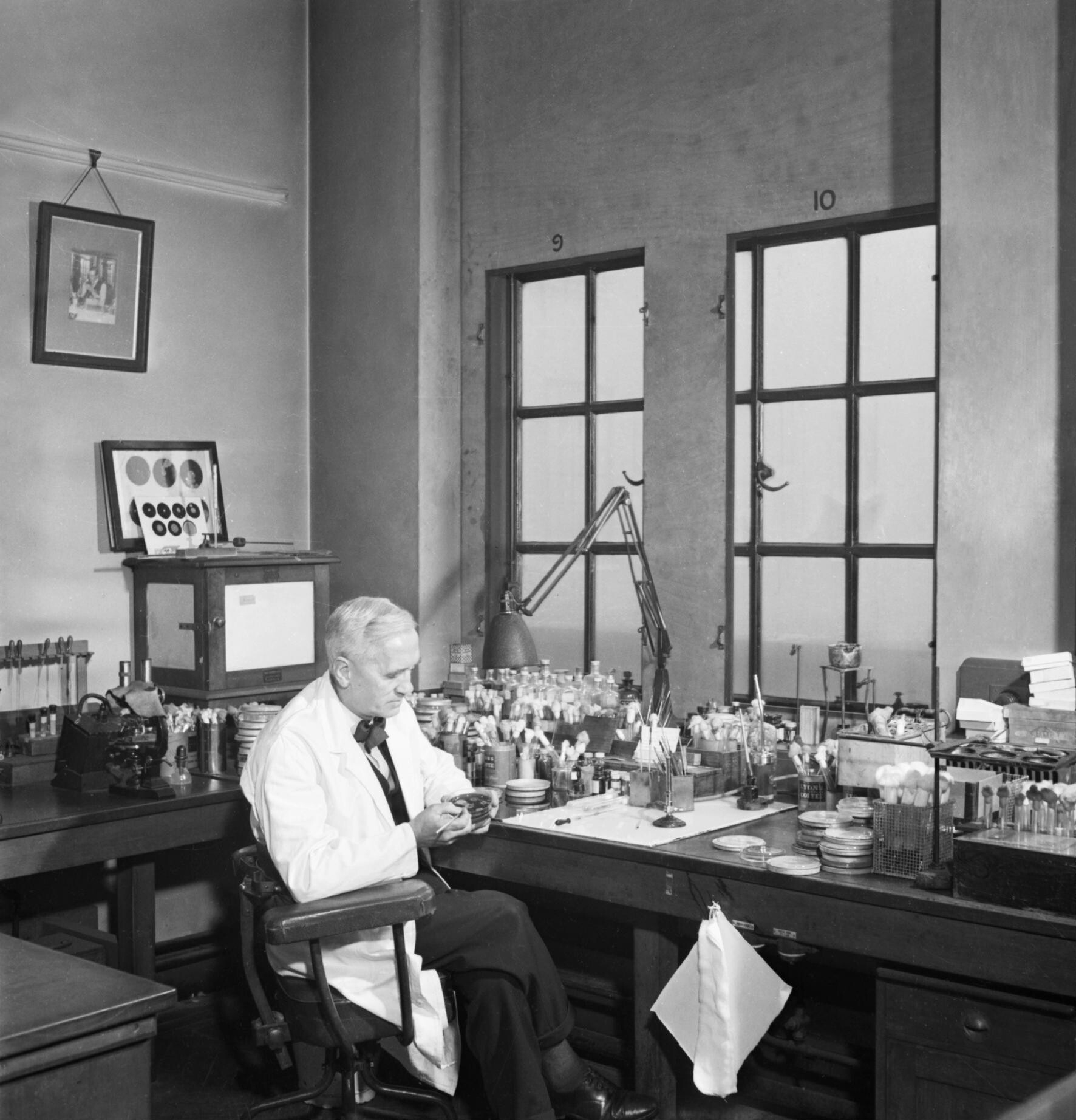
Fleming in his laboratory in 1943

Fleming also successfully treated severe conjunctivitis in 1932. Keith Bernard Rogers, who had joined St Mary's as medical student in 1929, was captain of the London University rifle team and was about to participate in an inter-hospital rifle shooting competition when he developed conjunctivitis. Fleming applied his penicillin and cured Rogers before the competition. It is said that the "penicillin worked and the match was won." However, the report that "Keith was probably the first patient to be treated clinically with penicillin ointment" is no longer true as Paine's medical records showed up.

There is a popular assertion both in popular and scientific literature that Fleming largely abandoned penicillin work in the early 1930s. In his review of André Maurois's The Life of Sir Alexander Fleming, Discoverer of Penicillin, William L. Kissick went so far as to say that "Fleming had abandoned penicillin in 1932... Although the recipient of many honors and the author of much scientific work, Sir Alexander Fleming does not appear to be an ideal subject for a biography." This is false, as Fleming continued to pursue penicillin research.

As late as in 1939, Fleming's notebook shows attempts to make better penicillin production using different media. In 1941, he published a method for assessment of penicillin effectiveness. As to the chemical isolation and purification, Howard Florey and Ernst Chain at the Radcliffe Infirmary in Oxford took up the research to mass-produce it, which they achieved with support from World War II military projects under the British and US governments.

By mid-1942, the Oxford team produced the pure penicillin compound as yellow powder. In August 1942, Harry Lambert (an associate of Fleming's brother Robert) was admitted to St Mary's Hospital due to a life-threatening infection of the nervous system (streptococcal meningitis). Fleming treated him with sulphonamides, but Lambert's condition deteriorated. He tested the antibiotic susceptibility and found that his penicillin could kill the bacteria. At Fleming's request, Florey sent the incompletely purified sample, which Fleming immediately administered into Lambert's spinal canal. Lambert showed signs of improvement the very next day, and completely recovered within a week. Fleming published the clinical case in The Lancet in 1943.

Upon this medical breakthrough, Allison informed the British Ministry of Health of the importance of penicillin and the need for mass production. The War Cabinet was convinced of the usefulness upon which Sir Cecil Weir, Director General of Equipment, called for a meeting on the mode of action on 28 September 1942. The Penicillin Committee was created on 5 April 1943. The committee consisted of Weir as chairman, Fleming, Florey, Sir Percival Hartley, Allison and representatives from pharmaceutical companies as members. The main goals were to produce penicillin rapidly in large quantities with collaboration of American companies, and to supply the drug exclusively for Allied armed forces. By D-Day in 1944, enough penicillin had been produced to treat all the wounded of the Allied troops.

==== Antibiotic resistance ====
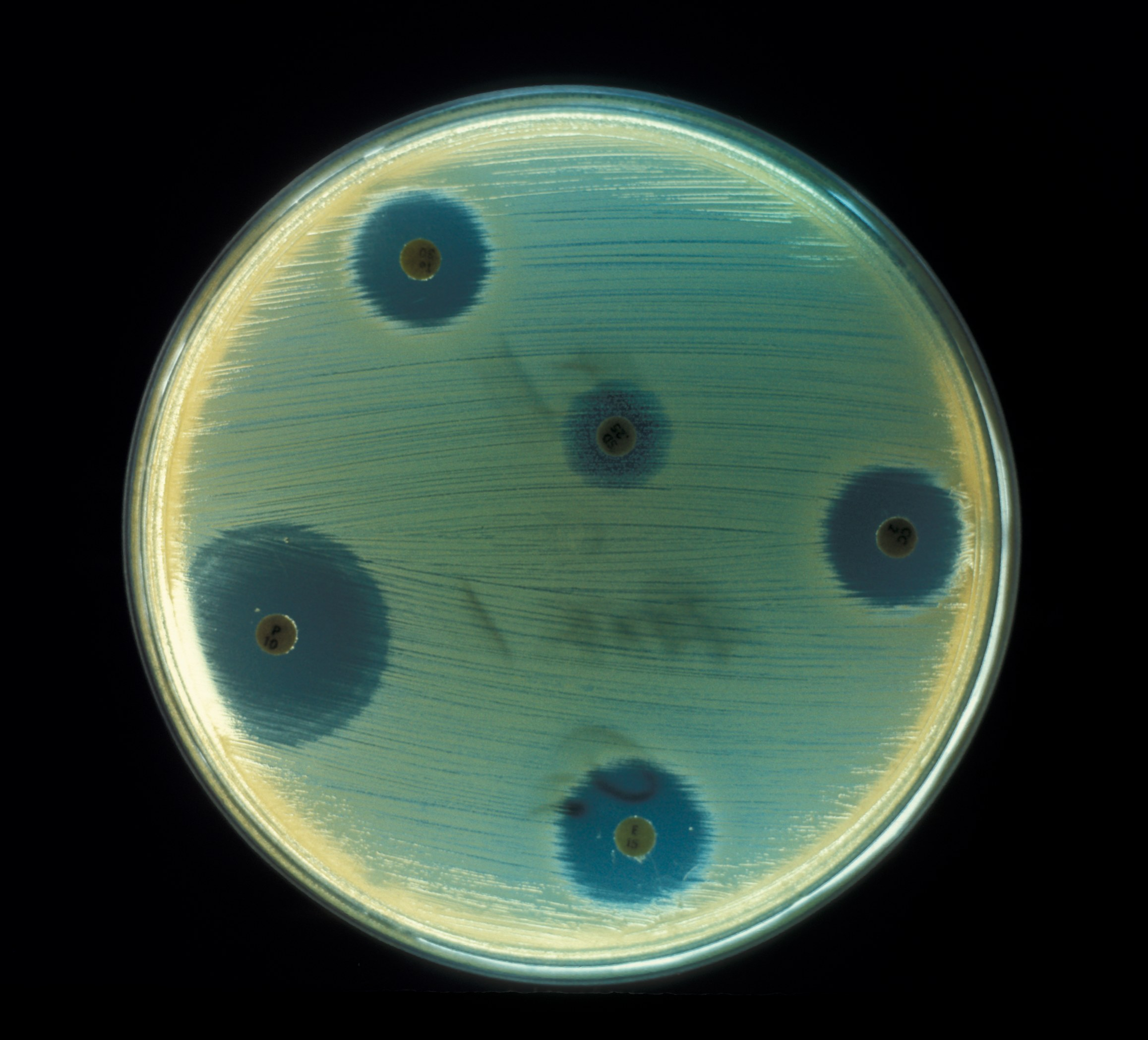
Modern antibiotics are tested using a method similar to Fleming's discovery.

Fleming also discovered very early that bacteria developed antibiotic resistance whenever too little penicillin was used or when it was used for too short a period. Almroth Wright had predicted antibiotic resistance even before it was noticed during experiments. Fleming cautioned about the use of penicillin in his many speeches around the world.

On 26 June 1945, he made the following cautionary statements: "the microbes are educated to resist penicillin and a host of penicillin-fast organisms is bred out ... In such cases the thoughtless person playing with penicillin is morally responsible for the death of the man who finally succumbs to infection with the penicillin-resistant organism. I hope this evil can be averted." He cautioned not to use penicillin unless there was a properly diagnosed reason for it to be used, and that if it were used, never to use too little, or for too short a period, since these are the circumstances under which bacterial resistance to antibiotics develops.

It had been experimentally shown in 1942 that S. aureus could develop penicillin resistance under prolonged exposure. Elaborating the possibility of penicillin resistance in clinical conditions in his Nobel Lecture, Fleming said:

The time may come when penicillin can be bought by anyone in the shops. Then there is the danger that the ignorant man may easily underdose himself and by exposing his microbes to non-lethal quantities of the drug make them resistant.

It was around that time that the first clinical case of penicillin resistance was reported.

== Personal life ==
On 24 December 1915, Fleming married a trained nurse, Sarah Marion McElroy of Killala, County Mayo, Ireland. Their only child, Robert Fleming (1924–2015), became a general medical practitioner. After his first wife's death in 1949, Fleming married Amalia Koutsouri-Vourekas, a Greek colleague at St. Mary's, on 9 April 1953; she died in 1986.

Fleming came from a Presbyterian background, while his first wife Sarah was a (lapsed) Roman Catholic. It is said that he was not particularly religious, and their son Robert was later received into the Anglican church, while still reportedly inheriting his two parents' fairly irreligious disposition.

When Fleming learned of Robert D. Coghill and Andrew J. Moyer patenting the method of penicillin production in the United States in 1944, he was furious, and commented:

I found penicillin and have given it free for the benefit of humanity. Why should it become a profit-making monopoly of manufacturers in another country?

From 1921 until his death in 1955, Fleming owned a country home named "The Dhoon" in Barton Mills, Suffolk.

== Death ==
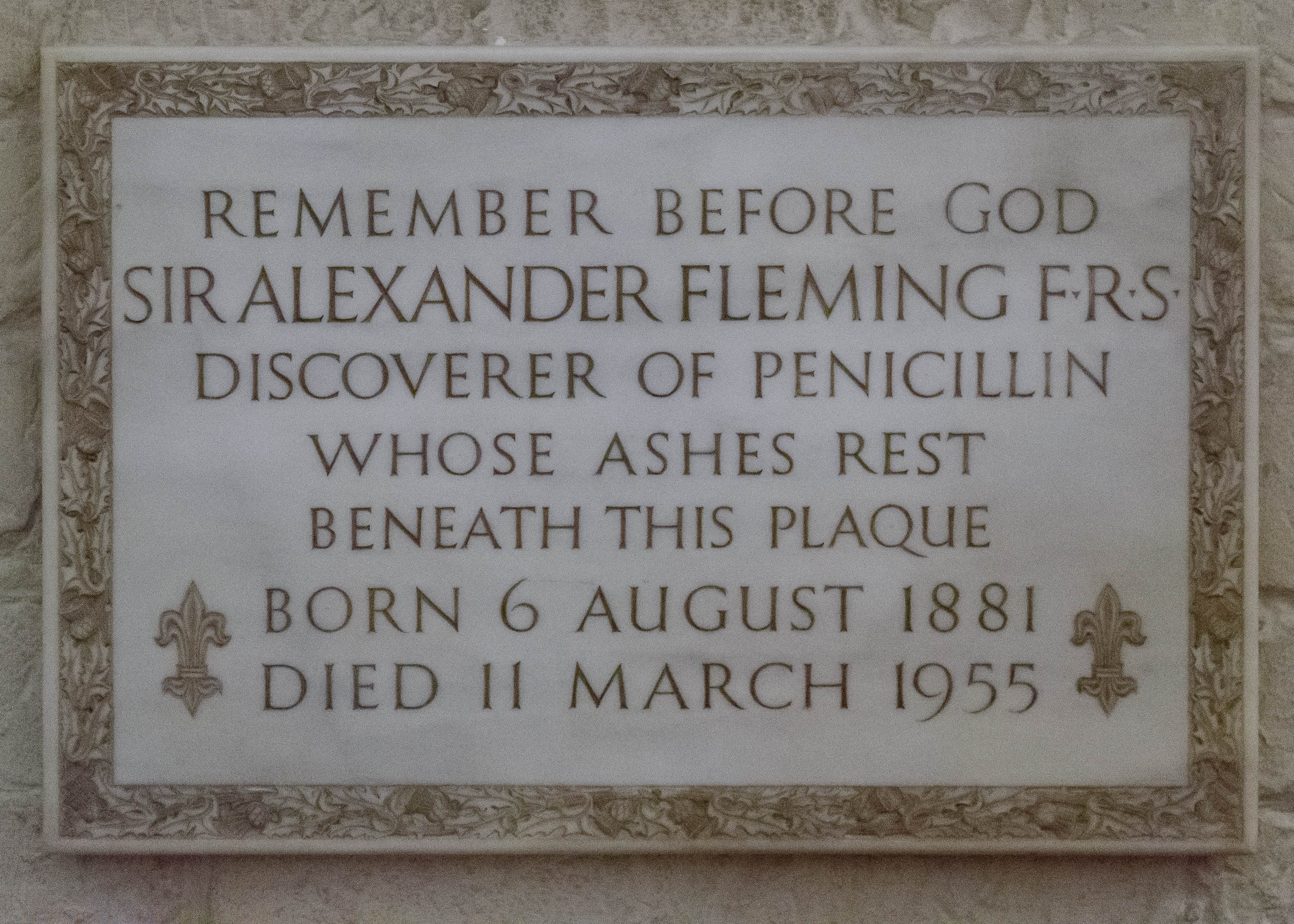
The grave of Sir Alexander Fleming in the crypt of St Paul's Cathedral, London

On 11 March 1955, Fleming died at his home in London of a heart attack. His ashes are buried in St Paul's Cathedral.

== Awards and legacy ==
A display of Fleming's awards, including his Nobel Prize, a sample of penicillin and an early apparatus for preparing it.

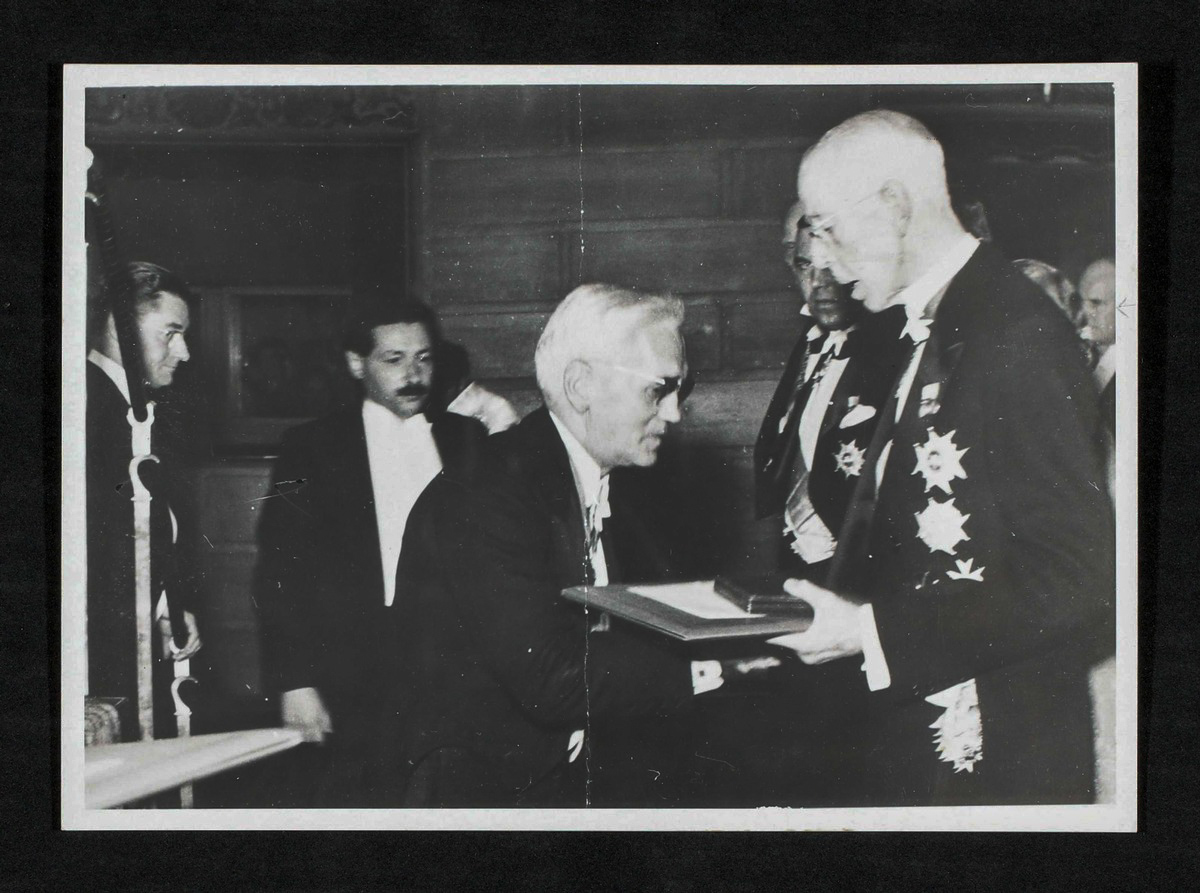
Sir Alexander Fleming (centre) receiving the Nobel prize from King Gustaf V of Sweden (right) in 1945

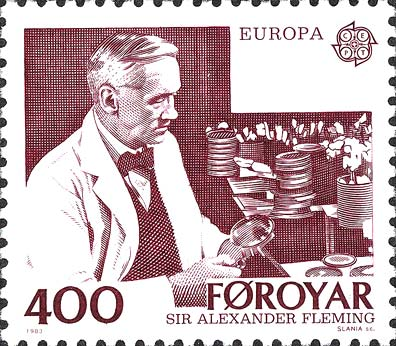
A Faroe Islands postage stamp commemorating Fleming

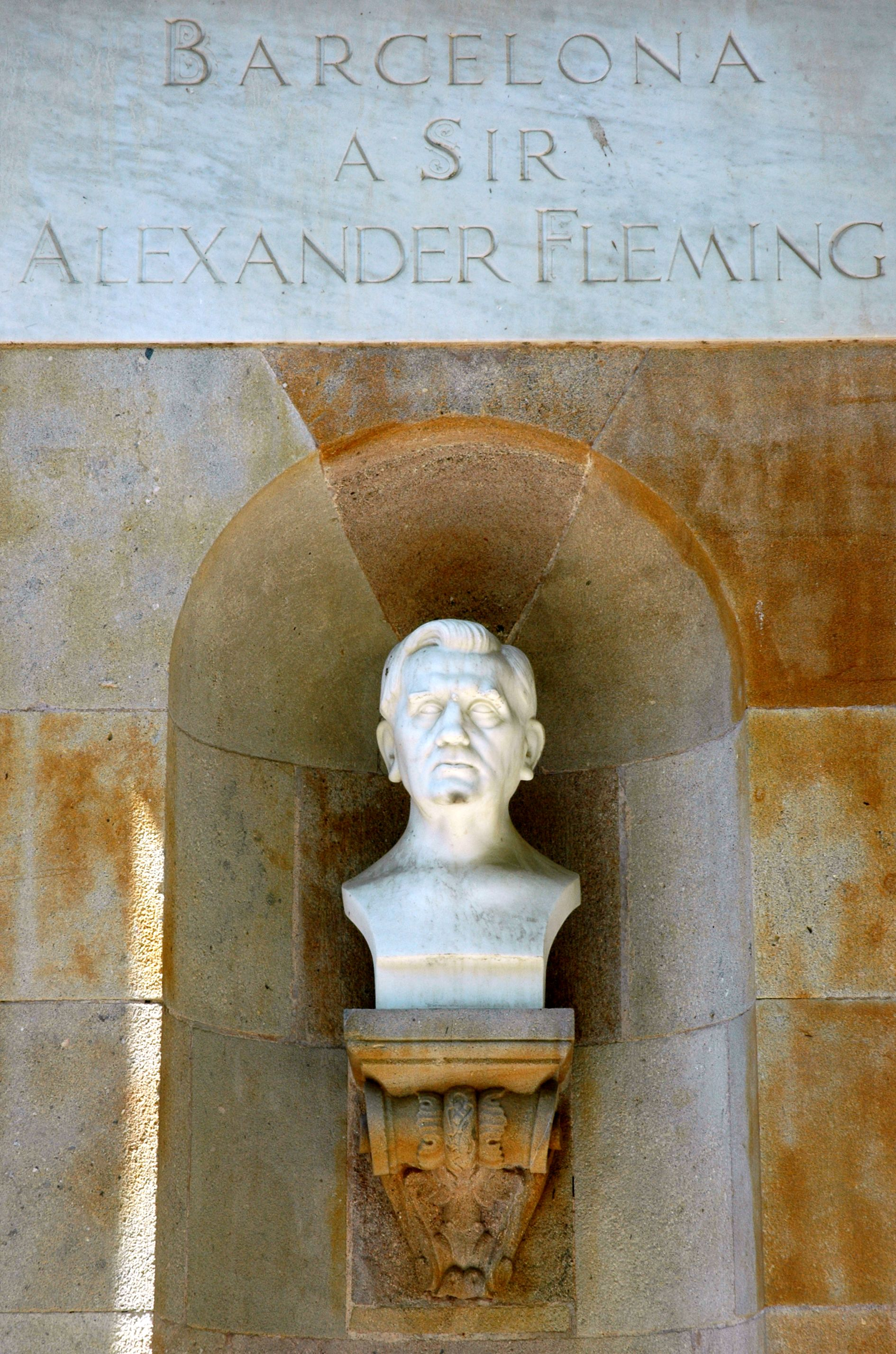
Barcelona to Sir Alexander Fleming (1956), by Catalan sculptor Josep Manuel Benedicto. Barcelona: jardins del Doctor Fleming.

Fleming's discovery of penicillin changed the world of modern medicine by introducing the age of useful antibiotics; penicillin has saved, and is still saving, millions of people around the world.

The laboratory at St Mary's Hospital where Fleming discovered penicillin is home to the Fleming Museum, a popular London attraction. His alma mater, St Mary's Hospital Medical School, merged with Imperial College London in 1988. The Sir Alexander Fleming Building on the South Kensington campus was opened in 1998, where his son Robert and his great-granddaughter Claire were presented to the Queen; it is now one of the main preclinical teaching sites of the Imperial College School of Medicine.

His other alma mater, the Royal Polytechnic Institution (now the University of Westminster) has named one of its student halls of residence Alexander Fleming House, which is near to Old Street.

- Fleming, Florey and Chain jointly received the Nobel Prize in Medicine in 1945. According to the rules of the Nobel committee, a maximum of three people may share the prize. Fleming's Nobel Prize medal was acquired by the National Museums of Scotland in 1989 and is on display after the museum re-opened in 2011.
- He was a member of the Pontifical Academy of Sciences.
- He was elected a Fellow of the Royal Society (FRS) in 1943.
- In 1951 he was elected the Rector of the University of Edinburgh for a term of three years.
- He was awarded the Hunterian Professorship by the Royal College of Surgeons of England.
- He was knighted as a Knight Bachelor by King George VI in 1944.
- He was awarded the Medal for Merit by the President of the United States.
- He was made a Grand Cross of the Legion of Honour by the French Republic.
- He was made a Grand Cross of the Order of the Phoenix of Greece.
- He was made a Knight Grand Cross of the Order of Alfonso X the Wise (Spain) in 1948.
- In 1999, Time magazine named Fleming one of the 100 Most Important People of the 20th century, stating:
  It was a discovery that would change the course of history. The active ingredient in that mould, which Fleming named penicillin, turned out to be an infection-fighting agent of enormous potency. When it was finally recognized for what it was, the most efficacious life-saving drug in the world, penicillin would alter forever the treatment of bacterial infections. By the middle of the century, Fleming's discovery had spawned a huge pharmaceutical industry, churning out synthetic penicillins that would conquer some of mankind's most ancient scourges, including syphilis, gangrene and tuberculosis.
- The importance of his work was recognized by the placement of an International Historic Chemical Landmark plaque at the Alexander Fleming Laboratory Museum in London on 19 November 1999.
- When 2000 was approaching, at least three large Swedish magazines ranked penicillin as the most important discovery of the millennium.
- In 2002, Fleming was named in the BBC's list of the 100 Greatest Britons following a nationwide vote.
- A statue of him stands outside the main bullring in Madrid, Plaza de Toros de Las Ventas. It was erected by subscription from grateful matadors, as penicillin greatly reduced the number of deaths in the bullring.
- Flemingovo náměstí is a square named after Fleming in the university area of the Dejvice community in Prague.
- A secondary school is named after him in Sofia, Bulgaria.
- In Athens, a small square in the downtown district of Votanikos is named after Fleming and bears his bust. There are also a number of streets in greater Athens and other towns in Greece named after either Fleming or his Greek second wife Amalia.
- In mid-2009, he was commemorated on a new series of banknotes issued by the Clydesdale Bank; his image appears on the new issue of £5 notes.
- In 2009, Fleming was voted third greatest Scot in an opinion poll conducted by STV, behind only Scotland's national poet Robert Burns and national hero William Wallace.
- 91006 Fleming, an asteroid in the Asteroid Belt, is named after him.
- Fleming metro station, on the Thessaloniki Metro system, takes its name from Fleming Street on which it is located.
- Sir Alexander Fleming College, a British school in Trujillo, northern Peru
- He and Howard Florey were jointly awarded the Cameron Prize for Therapeutics of the University of Edinburgh in 1945.
- Rue Alexander Fleming in the borough of Saint-Laurent in Montreal is named in his honour.
- The Fleming crater on the moon is named after him and the Scottish astronomer Williamina Fleming.
- Mount Fleming in New Zealand's Paparoa Range was named after him in 1970 by the Department of Scientific and Industrial Research.
- Biomedical Sciences Research Center "Alexander Fleming", a research organization in Greece established in the vision of his wife Amalia Fleming.
- In March 2025, a gable-end mural featuring a portrait of Fleming was unveiled in the centre of Darvel. It is the work of Glasgow-based artist Rogue One.
- In September 2025, a branch of the Wetherspoons pub chain opened in Paddington Basin, near to St Mary's Hospital, named the Sir Alexander Fleming.

== Myths ==
=== The Fleming myth ===
By 1942, penicillin, produced as pure compound, was still in short supply and not available for clinical use. When Fleming used the first few samples prepared by the Oxford team to treat Harry Lambert who had streptococcal meningitis, the successful treatment was major news, particularly popularised in The Times. Wright was surprised to discover that Fleming and the Oxford team had not been mentioned, though Oxford was attributed as the source of the drug. Wright wrote to the editor of The Times, which eagerly interviewed Fleming, but Florey prohibited the Oxford team from seeking media coverage. As a consequence, only Fleming was widely publicised in the media, which led to the misconception that he was entirely responsible for the discovery and development of the drug. Fleming himself referred to this incident as "the Fleming myth."

=== The Churchills ===
The popular story of Winston Churchill's father paying for Fleming's education after Fleming's father saved young Winston from death is false. According to the biography, Penicillin Man: Alexander Fleming and the Antibiotic Revolution by Kevin Brown, Alexander Fleming, in a letter to his friend and colleague André Gratia, described this as "A wondrous fable." Nor did he save Winston Churchill during World War II. Churchill was saved by Lord Moran, using sulfonamides, since he had no experience with penicillin, when Churchill fell ill in Carthage in Tunisia in 1943.

The Daily Telegraph and The Morning Post on 21 December 1943 wrote that he had been saved by penicillin. He was saved by the new sulfonamide drug sulfapyridine, known at the time under the research code M&B 693, discovered and produced by May & Baker Ltd, Dagenham, Essex – a subsidiary of the French group Rhône-Poulenc. In a subsequent radio broadcast, Churchill referred to the new drug as "This admirable M&B".

== See also ==
- Fleming Prize Lecture
- People on Scottish banknotes

Academic offices
Preceded by Alastair Sim	Rector of the University of Edinburgh; 1951–1954	Succeeded by Sydney Smith
