= Amalia Fleming =

Greek physician, bacteriologist

- Sketch of Lady Amalia Fleming at c. 1970-1975

Personal details
- Born: 28 June 1912 Constantinople, Ottoman Empire
- Died: 26 February 1986 (aged 73) Athens, Greece
- Spouses: Manoli Vourekas (divorced); Alexander Fleming (m. 1953; died 1955)

Amalia, Lady Fleming (née Koutsouri, formerly Vourekas; Greek: Αμαλία Κουτσούρη-Φλέμινγκ; 28 June 1912 – 26 February 1986) was a Greek physician, bacteriologist, human rights activist and politician.

== Early life and education ==
Fleming was born in Constantinople, Ottoman Empire (now Istanbul, Turkey), in 1912. Her father was Harikios Koutsouris, a physician. In 1914, with the outbreak of the First World War and the rise of the "racially intolerant Pan-Turkish state", with the family home lost and her father's laboratory confiscated, she fled to Athens with her family.

She studied medicine, and particularly bacteriology, at the University of Athens. From 1938 to 1944 she worked as a bacteriologist at Athens City Hospital. She married Manoli Vourekas, an architect.

== Second World War ==
In April 1941 Greece was occupied by the Axis German and Italian forces. Amalia and her husband joined the Greek Resistance. She helped many British, New Zealand and Greek soldiers escape occupied Greece, transcribed BBC broadcasts, and produced fake identity cards for Greek Jews and foreign officers.

She was arrested and jailed for her activities by the Italians. She feigned appendicitis as she knew she would be moved to the prison hospital from which it would be easier to escape. Following her appendix operation, she was instead handed over to the Gestapo and sentenced to death. In 1944 she was rescued from prison by British troops during the Allied advance into Greece.

== London ==
With the end of the war, Greece was in ruins and many thousands dead. In 1947 the Greek Civil War broke out between Communist-led fighters and Greek government army of conservative royalists. Amalia and her husband divorced.

By good fortune in 1947 she was successful in her application for a British Council scholarship which enabled her to do postgraduate studies in bacteriology at St. Mary's Hospital, London. There she worked with Sir Alexander Fleming in his Wright-Fleming Institute of Microbiology. She authored nine research publications between May 1947 and August 1952 and she collaborated with Sir Alexander Fleming on several papers.

She married Sir Alexander Fleming on 9 April 1953, after the death of his first wife, but with his death on 11 March 1955 she was widowed less than two years later. Amalia organised Fleming's papers and ensured the publication of a scientific monograph of his life and work.

== Regime of the Colonels ==
As a person with dual nationality (Greek and British), Amalia Fleming began from 1962 to spend more time in Greece and moved there permanently in 1967. Her return coincided with a military coup and the subsequent rule of Greece by the Greek military junta of 1967–1974 (commonly known as the Regime of the Colonels).

She undertook humanitarian efforts on behalf of members of the opposition who had been arrested and often tortured by the regime and of their family members left in poverty after the arrests.

She was arrested in 1971 and sentenced to sixteen months in prison for plotting the escape from jail of Alexandros Panagoulis who had been convicted of attempting to assassinate Georgios Papadopoulos, the head of the military junta. She was released from prison less than a month later due to health problems but was stripped of her Greek citizenship and deported to Britain.

Over the following few years in London, she mounted, in conjunction with Melina Mercouri and Helen Vlachos, a "non-stop publicity campaign" against the Greek dictatorship until it finally collapsed in 1974. Fleming also made representations to the Human Rights Commission in Strasbourg regarding the torture of Greek political prisoners, continued to help imprisoned regime opponents and their families, and helped a number of the junta's opponents to escape from Greece.

== Political activities after 1974 ==
Fleming returned to Greece in 1974 after the fall of the junta. She joined the Panhellenic Socialist Movement (or PASOK) and was elected to the Greek Parliament in 1977, 1981 and 1985. She was an active campaigner for human rights and was a member of the European Commission of Human Rights and the first chair of the Greek committee of Amnesty International.

== Legacy ==
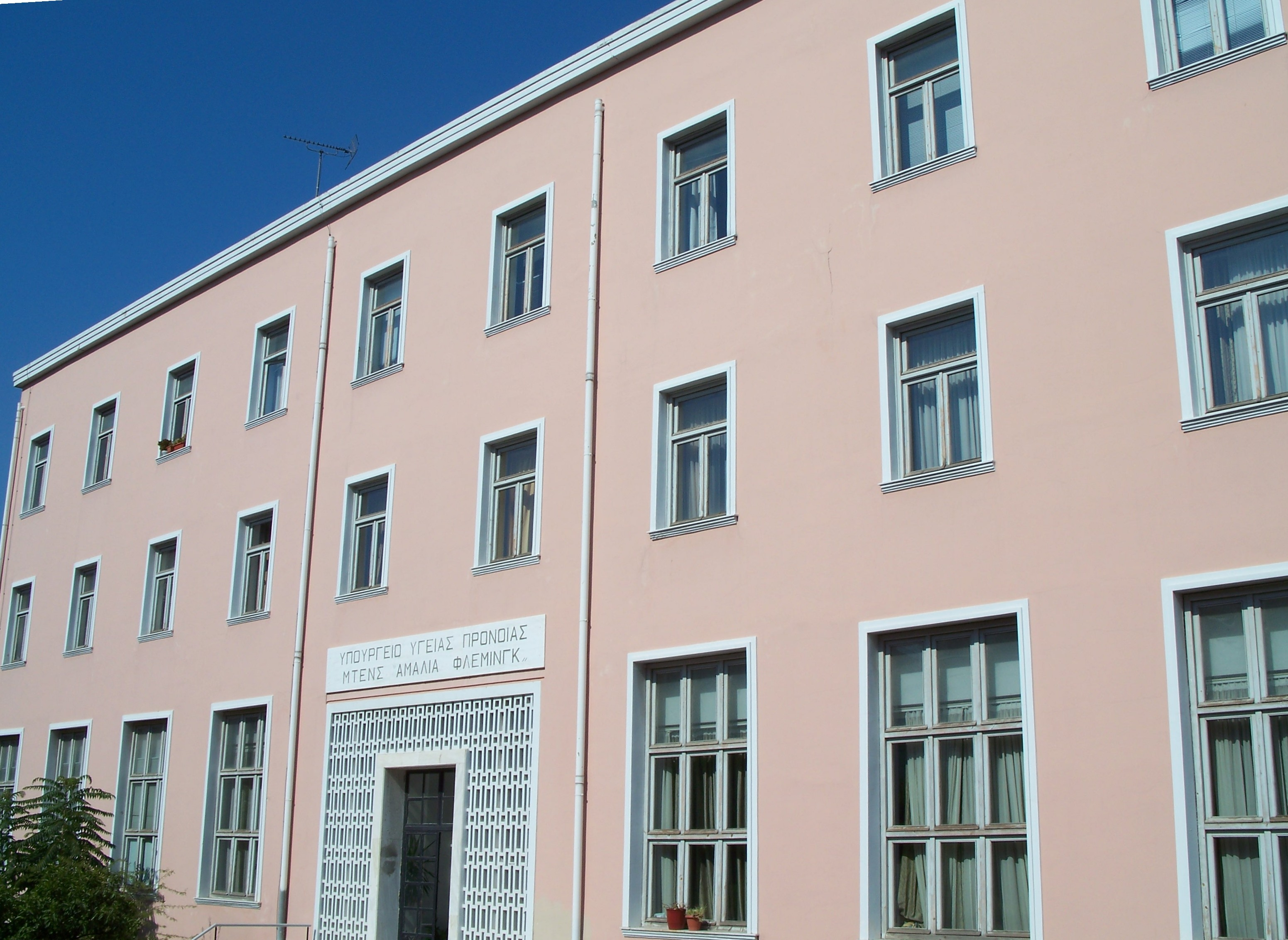
Amalia Fleming Hospital (Νοσοκομείο Αμαλία Φλέμινγκ), Athens

Fleming saw herself as a Greek patriot and a defender of democracy and independence, stating: "I was born a Greek and this is an incurable disease that nothing and no one can treat or change". After her death, the Greek government lamented her loss and praised her as "a great humanitarian, a fine democrat and a fighter for the Socialist cause".

She established the Greek Foundation for Basic Biological Research "Alexander Fleming" and "created the conditions to set up" the Biomedical Sciences Research Centre "Alexander Fleming" (often referred to as BSRC "Alexander Fleming" and the Alexander Fleming Biomedical Sciences Research Center), in Vari, a suburb of Athens.

In 1986 a hospital was founded at Melissia, a suburb of Athens, and named after her (currently known as Sismanogleio-Amalia Fleming General Hospital).

WHO Collaborating Centre's Public Health Education & Training lecture series is named in Fleming's honour.

== Awards ==
- Order of Beneficence (1965)

== Bibliography ==
- A Piece of Truth (London: Jonathan Cape, 1972; Boston, Houghton Mifflin, 1973)
