= Andrew J. Moyer =

American microbiologist

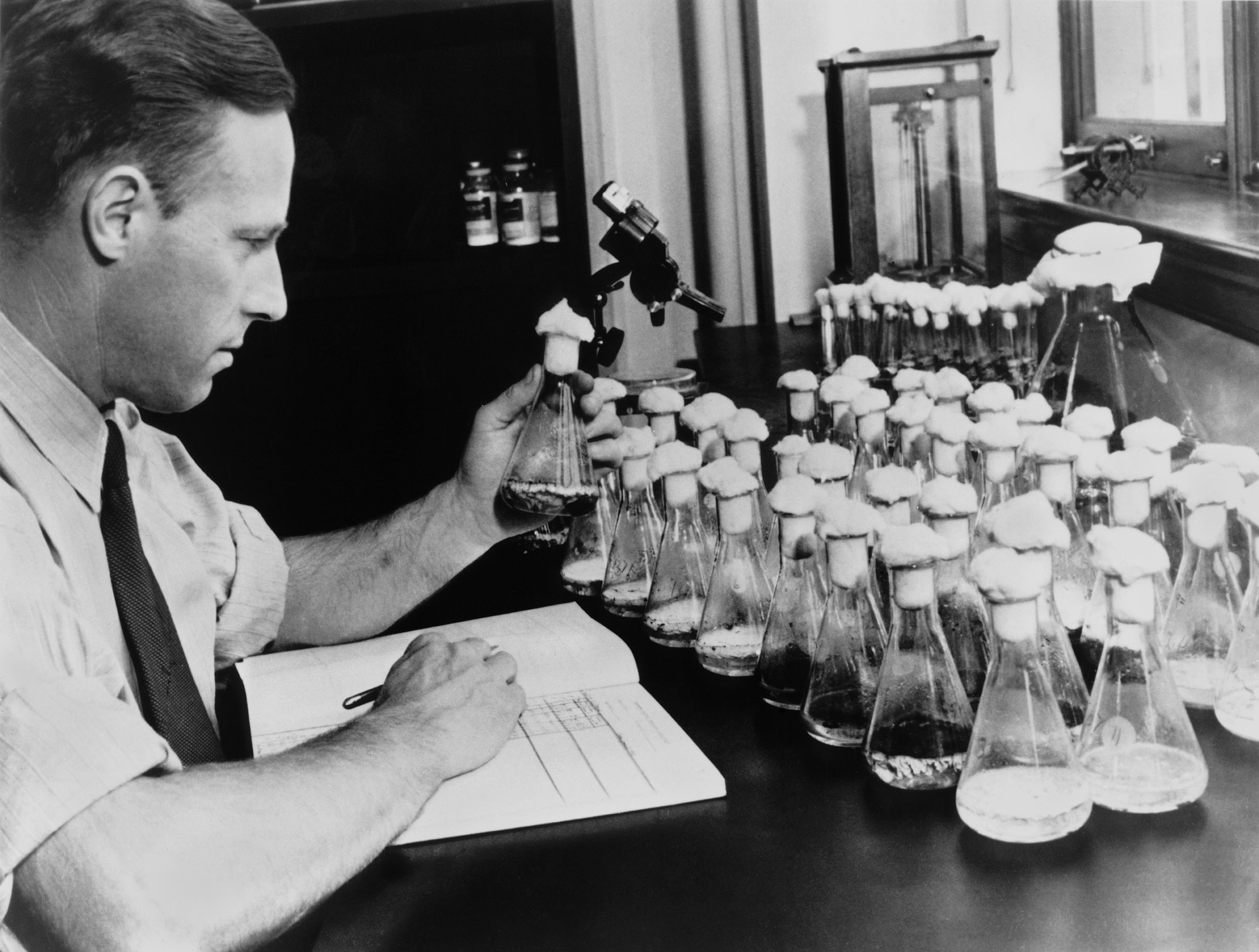
- Born: November 30, 1899; Van Buren Township
- Died: February 17, 1959 (aged 59); Bay Pines
- Education: Wabash College
- Occupation: Mycologist
- Awards: National Inventors Hall of Fame (1987)

Andrew J. Moyer (November 30, 1899 – February 17, 1959) was an American microbiologist. He was a researcher at the USDA Northern Regional Research Laboratory in Peoria, Illinois. His group was responsible for the development of techniques for the mass production of penicillin. This led to the wide scale use of penicillin in World War II.

== Early life and education ==
Moyer was born in Star City, Indiana. He graduated from Wabash College with an A.B. in 1922, North Dakota Agricultural College with an M.S. in 1925, University of Maryland with a Ph.D. in 1929.

== Penicillin ==
As early as in 1874, the Austrian medic Theodor Billroth discovered the bacteriostatic properties of Penicillin. Alexander Fleming picked up on these studies in 1928, but decided not to claim any patent rights for the good of medical care. Further development and medical trials were conducted by a team working under Howard Florey with Norman Heatley as a junior member. The first use on a human occurred in December 1940, but wartime shortages and restrictions limited the supply of the drug.

In 1941, Heatley and Florey travelled to the United States because they wanted to produce about one kilogram of pure penicillin, and persuaded a laboratory in Peoria, Illinois, to develop larger-scale manufacturing of it. In Peoria, Heatley was assigned to work with Moyer. Moyer suggested adding corn-steep liquor, a by-product of starch extraction, to the growth medium. With this and other subtle changes, such as using lactose in place of glucose, they were able to push up yields of penicillin to 20 units per millilitre. But their cooperation had become one-sided. Heatley noted, "Moyer had begun not telling me what he was doing."

Florey returned to Oxford that September, but Heatley stayed on in Peoria until December; then for the next six months, he worked at Merck & Co. in Rahway, New Jersey. In July 1942, he returned to Oxford and was soon to learn why Moyer had become so secretive. When he published their research results, he omitted Heatley's name from the paper, despite an original contract which stipulated that any publications should be jointly authored. Fifty years on, Heatley confessed that he was amused, rather than upset, by Moyer's duplicity. Later he was to learn that financial greed had led Moyer to claim all the credit for himself. To have acknowledged Heatley's part of the work would have made it difficult to apply for patents, as he did, with himself as sole inventor.

When Fleming learned of Moyer's and Robert D. Coghill patenting the method of penicillin production in the United States in 1944, he was furious, and commented:

I found penicillin and have given it free for the benefit of humanity. Why should it become a profit-making monopoly of manufacturers in another country?

== Legacy ==
Moyer was inducted into the National Inventors Hall of Fame in 1987. A scholarship fund was created in his name at the University of Maryland in 1977.
