= Alexander Fleming Biomedical Sciences Research Center =

Greek research organization

"Alexander Fleming" Biomedical Sciences Research Center
- Established: 1995
- Mission: Research molecular mechanisms of biological processes in health and disease
- President: George Panayotou
- Location: Vari, Athens, Greece
- Coordinates: 37.8259°N 23.7930°E
- Interactive map of "Alexander Fleming" Biomedical Sciences Research Center
- Website: https://www.fleming.gr/

The Biomedical Sciences Research Center "Alexander Fleming" (BSRC Al. Fleming, Greek: Ερευνητικό Κέντρο Βιοϊατρικών Επιστημών "Αλέξανδρος Φλέμινγκ") is a governmental, non-profit research organisation based in Vari, Athens, Greece. The Center is named after the scientist Alexander Fleming and his widow, Amalia Fleming "created the conditions to set up" this Center.

== History ==
In 1965, microbiologist Amalia Fleming established the Hellenic Foundation for Basic Biological Research "Alexander Fleming", which she named in memory of her husband and fellow scientist Alexander Fleming. The next year in 1966, the Church granted to the foundation 128,000 square meters of land in Vari, a suburb of Athens. Construction started in 1968, however it was interrupted in 1971 after the arrest of Amalia Fleming for actions against the military junta. Construction then resumed in 1975 and ended in 1993, thirteen years after Amalia's death. A 6000 square meters building was built on the site, which was financed mainly by the 1st EU Framework Program.

Two years later, in 1995, the Biomedical Sciences Research Center "Alexander Fleming" was established and it started operations in 1998. It is under the supervision of the General Secretariat of Research and Technology of the Ministry of Development and Investment.

== Research ==
Since the beginning of its operations in 1998, the Center develops basic as well as translational and applied research programs in biomedical sciences. Currently, the Center hosts 14 research groups distributed in 4 Institutes (Immunology, Molecular Oncology, Molecular Biology and Genetics, Cellular & Developmental Biology). Over the short period since its establishment, BSRC Al. Fleming has gained extensive visibility in the European science arena.

=== Mission ===
B.S.R.C. Fleming promotes research, aiming to understand molecular mechanisms of biological processes in health and disease. They also aim to contribute to medicine, by developing new therapeutic and diagnostic methods, focusing on immunity and inflammation, cancer, and neurodegenerative diseases.

=== Main areas of research ===
Functional genomics and proteomics; Molecular and cellular immunology; Animal models of human disease; Transcriptional and post-transcriptional mechanisms of gene regulation; DNA repair; Stem Cell differentiation; Epigenetics; Learning and memory; ECM biology. Fields of excellence: Molecular mechanisms of disease (inflammation, cancer, metabolic syndrome, CNS disorders).

=== Animal models ===
Fleming's researchers have established transgenic animal models for rheumatoid arthritis, inflammatory bowel disease and multiple sclerosis and these models have served as a basis for multiple collaborations with the international biopharmaceutical industry in the evaluation of novel therapeutic compounds, or as tools for collaborative R&D.

== Facilities ==
The Center is equipped with Core Units which include: an Expression Profiling Facility, a Flow Cytometry Facility, a Protein Chemistry Lab, a Transgenics and gene targeting Unit, and a BioIT Unit, all of which serve internal collaborations, as well as external partners in academia and industry. The Center also runs an Innovation and Enterprise Unit that facilitates the protection and exploitation of the Center’s research and technologies.

=== Animal House ===
BSRC Al. Fleming operates its own Animal House, which houses approximately 22,000 mice. Fleming’s Animal House provides husbandry of animals and services to the biomedical research community since 2001. It covers an area of approximately 900 m2 within the Center and is equipped with highly automated systems that provide the best possible conditions for mouse reproduction and maintenance. Its main activities include mouse hosting and supply (genetically altered mice, such as transgenic, knockout lines and chemically induced mutants developed by BSRC Al. Fleming researchers), phenotyping services, as well as education and training courses. The Animal House has 6 different Facilities-Units of SPF status and is currently the largest Mouse Animal House in Greece in terms of number and variety of mice. The Facility became a full member of EMMA in 2009.

== See also ==
- Biomedical research
