= Sir Alexander Fleming College =

Sir Alexander Fleming College (commonly known as Fleming College or simply Fleming) is a British school in Trujillo, northern Peru, it was the first English school outside Lima. Fleming College represents Cambridge University and is part of the British Schools of Peru (BSP) which includes other important English schools in Lima, such as Markham College, Cambridge College, Newton College and San Silvestre School. Many of the Fleming staff are from various English and Spanish-speaking countries including England, the United States, Denmark, Scotland, Chile and Mexico. The school has approximately 700 students. It includes audio-visual rooms, electronic smart boards and computer and science labs. The school is named after Alexander Fleming.

As every British school around the world, Fleming has the house system, led by 4 house captains, 2 in primary and 2 in secondary, and a teacher house representative. The houses are named by important English men, in this case are; Jeffreys (named after Alexander Jeffreys), Hawkings (named after Stephen Hawkings) and Bannister (named after Roger Bannister). The houses compete in different areas such as sports, during school olympics, academic and oral. At the end of the year, the house which won more points during the year, is awarded with the Annual House Prize.

Currently, students in primary and secondary are studying them. Also Fleming offers the International General Certificate of Secondary Education (IGCSE), by Cambridge University, in which students develop different attributes of the subjects chosen in English (except for the language courses, Spanish and French).

== University affiliations ==
- Cambridge University
- Pontificia Universidad Catolica del Peru
- Instituto de Monterrey (Mexico)
