= Fleming College Florence =

Liberal arts college in Italy, 1972–1977

Fleming College Florence was a private liberal arts college in Florence, Italy from 1972 to 1977. It offered a two-year coeducational program that granted an Associate of Arts degree. Florence College was originally founded in Lugano, Switzerland, in 1968, at what is now the campus of Franklin University Switzerland. The college relocated in 1972 to Torre Di Gattaia, just off Viale Michelangelo on a hill above Florence, Italy. Mary Leavitt Crist Fleming (1910–2009) was the founder of the college. From 1956 until her death on January 27, 2009, she involved with the international education of young Americans in Europe. The college was a division of the American School in Switzerland.

== History ==
Fleming College was founded in Lugano, Switzerland, by Mary Christ Fleming in 1968 on the grounds of Villa Negroni in Vezia. The original campus is now the campus of Franklin University Switzerland. After Fleming College in Lugano closed, Fleming established Fleming College Florence in Florence, Italy. Fleming College Florence offered a liberal arts program from 1972 to 1977.

Fleming College Florence incorporated the Institute for European Culture, a one-year, pre-university program previously located in Lugano, Switzerland. The college was a division of the American School In Switzerland. After briefly relocating from Torre di Gattaia to the Palazzo Bargagli-Petrucci on the Arno in Florence, Fleming College closed its doors in June 1977. The demise of the college has been attributed to the rise in inflation, "the gradual Marxianization of Italian culture and politics… that is hostile to private institutions of any kind", and to "punitive tax laws and nightmarish bureaucracy".
