= List of Australian heritage lists =

This article contains a list of heritage lists and registers in Australia.

== National ==
- Commonwealth Heritage List - register of historically significant places under the control of the Australian government
- Australian National Heritage List - register national heritage places deemed to be of outstanding heritage significance to Australia
- Australian National Shipwreck Database - a register of over 7000 wrecks located within Australian waters
- List of National Trust properties in Australia - properties owned by National Trust of Australia which are listed on at least one of the National, State or Local Government registers
- List of Overseas Places of Historic Significance to Australia

=== Former registers ===
- Register of the National Estate - replaced in 2007 by Commonwealth and Australian National Heritage lists

== Australian Capital Territory ==
- Australian Capital Territory Heritage Register
- List of buildings and structures in the Australian Capital Territory

== New South Wales ==
- New South Wales State Heritage Register

== Northern Territory ==
- Northern Territory Heritage Register

== Queensland ==
- Queensland Heritage Register
- List of heritage-listed buildings in Rockhampton

=== Regional ===
- Brisbane Heritage Register

== South Australia ==
- South Australian Heritage Register

=== Regional ===
- List of heritage-listed buildings in Burra
- List of state heritage places in the District Council of Grant

== Tasmania ==
- Tasmanian Heritage Register

== Victoria ==
- Victorian Heritage Register
- Victorian Aboriginal Heritage Register

=== Melbourne metropolitan area ===
- List of heritage-listed buildings in Melbourne

== Western Australia ==
=== Perth metropolitan area ===
- List of heritage buildings in Perth
- List of heritage places in Fremantle

=== Wheatbelt region ===
- List of heritage places in the Shire of Toodyay
- List of heritage places in York, Western Australia

=== Southwest region ===
- List of heritage places in Busselton

=== Peel region ===
- List of heritage places in the Shire of Waroona

=== Great Southern region ===
- List of places on the State Register of Heritage Places in the City of Albany
