= State Register of Heritage Places =

Register of historic sites in Western Australia

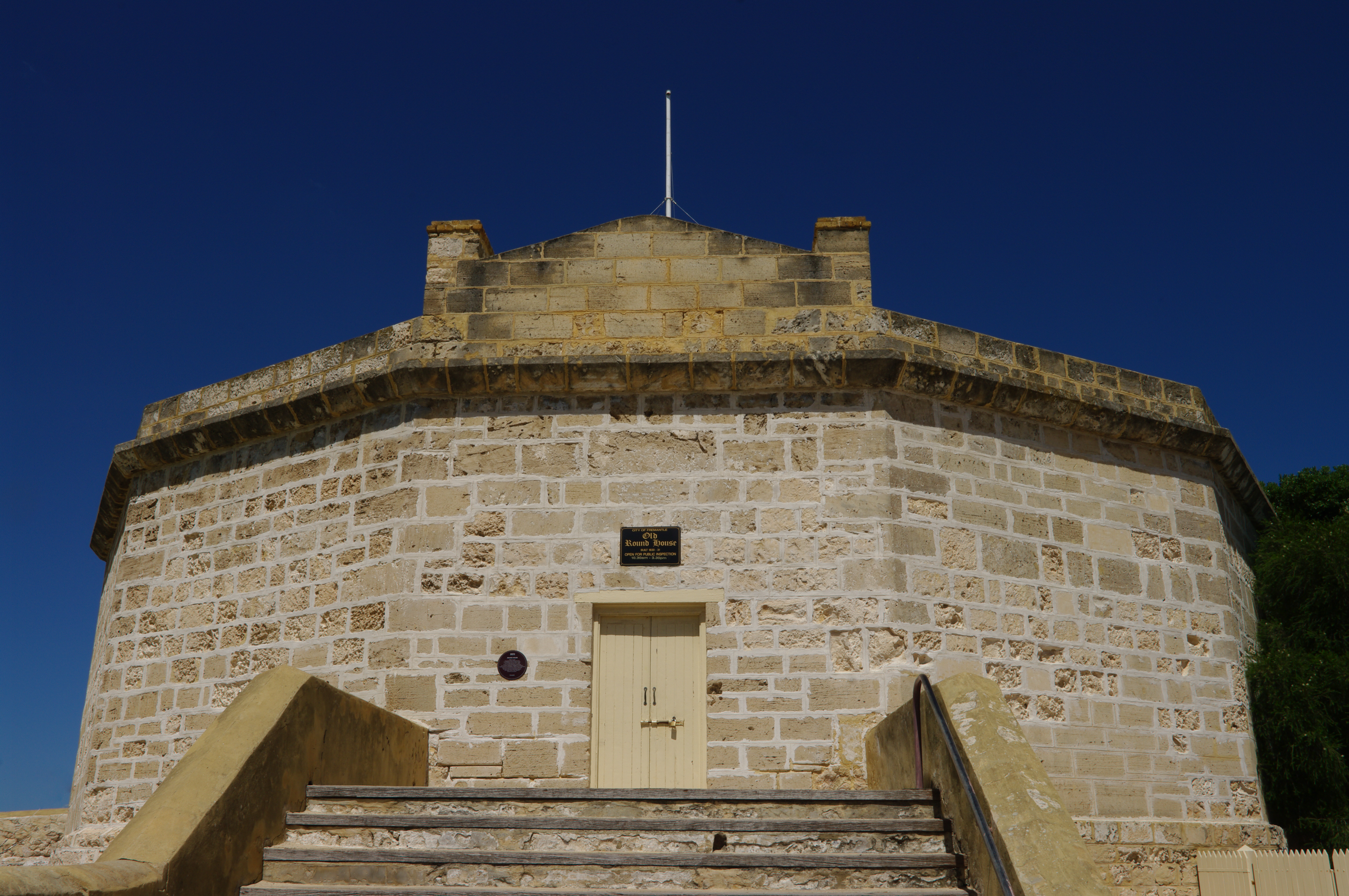
- The state heritage listed Round House (896), Fremantle, the first permanent building in the Swan River Colony (1830)
- Type: Heritage register of buildings, structures, gardens, cemeteries, memorials, landscapes and archaeological sites
- State: Western Australia
- Years: 1991–present
- Compiled by: Heritage Council of Western Australia

The State Register of Heritage Places is the heritage register of historic sites in Western Australia deemed significant at the state level by the Heritage Council of Western Australia.

== History ==
In the 1970s, following its establishment of the National Trust of Western Australia, the National Trust created a set of classified properties, and following legislation requiring inventories, Local Government authorities in Western Australia produced a subsequent set of Municipal Inventories, which then resulted in items then being included in the state register. As a result, most register records include dates and details from the three different processes. In some cases authorities other than councils had governance over localities such as Redevelopment authorities, and they also provided Heritage Inventories in that stage of the process.

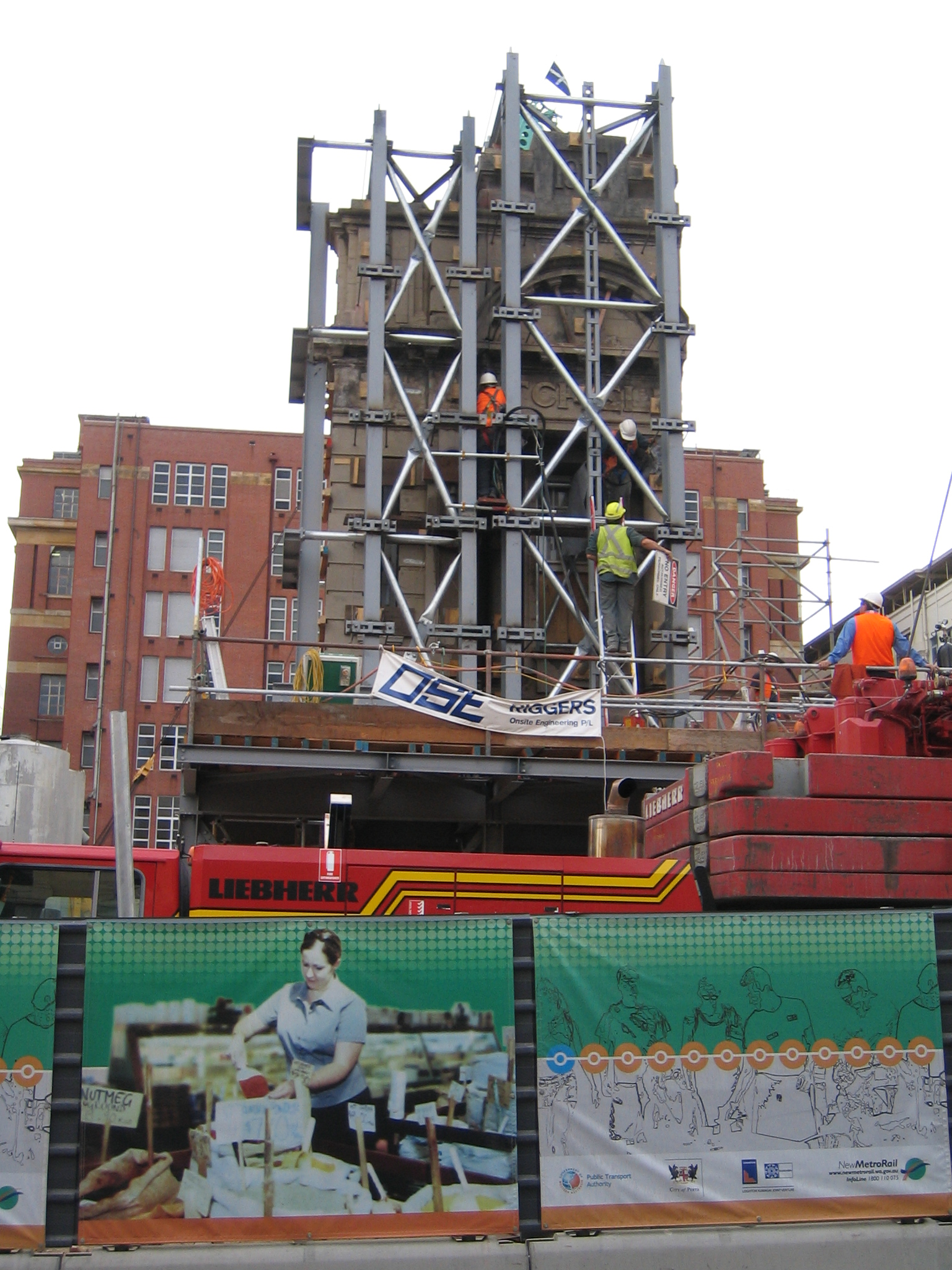
Portion of the Mitchells Buildings façade being removed for storage

Registration was not always a successful protection. The Mitchells Building on Wellington Street was state heritage listed in 2004 but demolished in 2005 to construct Perth Underground station, with only the facade preserved at another location.

== Listings ==
Places listed on the register include buildings, structures, gardens, cemeteries, memorials, landscapes and archaeological sites.

InHerit, the online list of heritage places in Western Australia, contains information about cultural heritage places listed in the State Register of Heritage Places as well as local government inventories, other lists, the Australian Government's heritage list, and other non-government lists and surveys. The Heritage Council of Western Australia, through the Heritage Act 2018, maintains the State Register of Heritage Places, Protection orders and the Heritage agreement while Local governments maintain their Heritage lists and the Australian Heritage Council the National heritage list. Additionally, Municipal Inventories are also part of the listings.

As of 2020, the State Register of Heritage Places listed 2,367 places, also this number includes sub-listings of individual buildings within heritage listed complexes. Approximately 1,300 places throughout Western Australia are on the State Register, while the database itself contains 25,000 state and local heritage places.

== Criteria ==
The Heritage Council uses criteria established in September 1991 to determine the cultural heritage significance of each place, as follows:

1. Aesthetic value
2. Historic value
3. Scientific value
4. Social value
5. Rarity
6. Representativeness
7. Condition
8. Integrity
9. Authenticity

== Register and available information ==
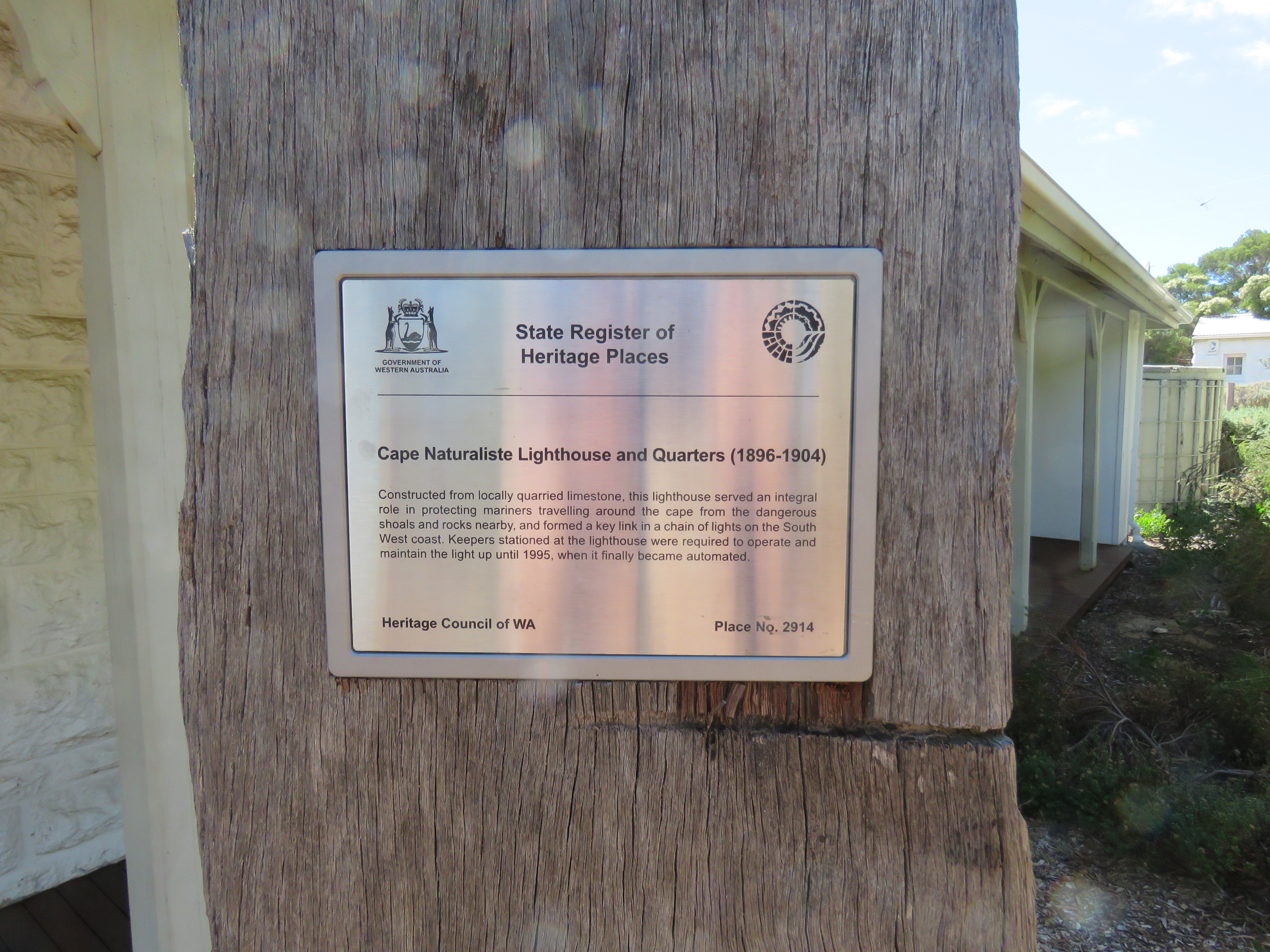
The State Register of Heritage Places plaque at the Cape Naturaliste Lighthouse

Places on the register can be searched by their name, location, local government area or place number.

Place number 00001, the former St Joseph's Convent in Albany details location (142-152 Aberdeen Street), former names (St Joseph's School for Young Ladies), local government area (City of Albany), region (Great Southern), construction date (from 1881 to 1978) and listings. For the St Joseph's Convent, these are State, National Trust and National Estate Register as well as the Municipal Inventory.

== See also ==
- List of Australian heritage lists
- List of heritage buildings in Perth, Western Australia
- National Trust of Western Australia
- Category:Lists of State Register of Heritage Places
- Category:State Register of Heritage Places by local government area
