= Australian Heritage Council =

Australian government advisory group on heritage matters

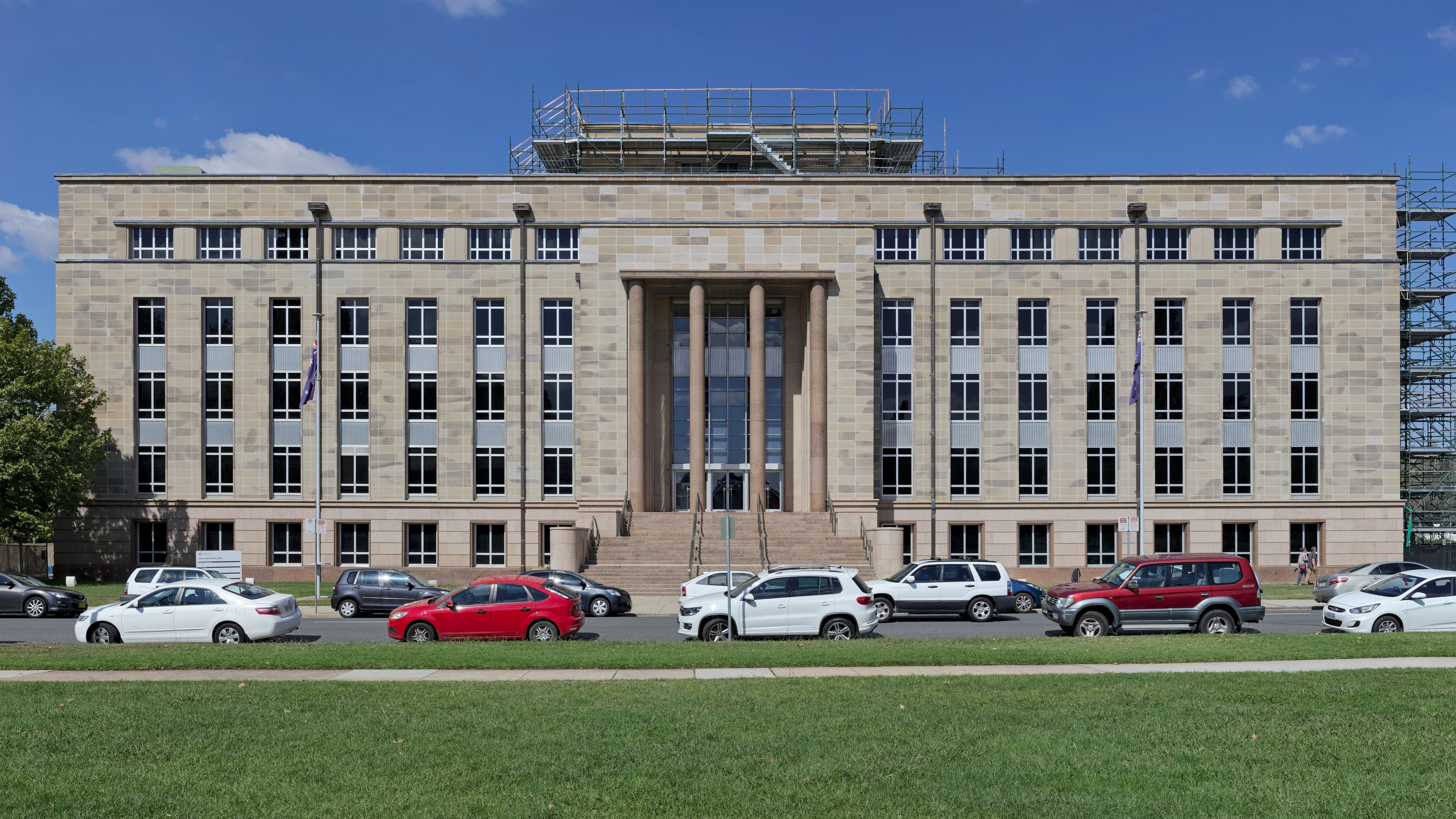
Department of the Environment and Energy

The Australian Heritage Council is the principal adviser to the Australian Government on heritage matters. It was established on 19 February 2004 by the Australian Heritage Council Act 2003. The Council replaced the Australian Heritage Commission as the Australian Government's independent expert advisory body on heritage matters when the new Commonwealth heritage system was introduced in 2004 under amendments to the Environment Protection and Biodiversity Conservation Act 1999. The Council assesses nominations for the Australian National Heritage List and the Commonwealth Heritage List. The Minister may ask the Council for advice on action that he may take in relation to the List of Overseas Places of Historic Significance to Australia.

== Role ==
The Council plays a key role in assessment, advice and policy formulation and support of major heritage programs. Its main responsibilities are to:

- assess places for the National Heritage List and the Commonwealth Heritage List
- nominate places for inclusion in the National Heritage List or Commonwealth Heritage List
- promote the identification, assessment, conservation and monitoring of heritage
- advise the Minister on various heritage matters including the preparation and amendment of heritage strategies and management plans for Commonwealth areas and agencies

== Publications ==
- Protection of Australia's Commemorative Places and Monuments Report - 2018
- National Heritage Places map - 2017
- Australia's National Heritage List - the story so far - 2017
- 'The Waters of Australian Deserts' Cultural Heritage Study - 2017
- A thematic heritage study on Australia's benevolent and other care institutions - Thematic Study and Companion Guide - 2016
- Rock Art Thematic Study - 2016
- AHC Submission on the Great Barrier Reef Strategic Assessment - 2014
- Identifying Commonwealth Heritage Values and Establishing a Heritage Register - 2010
- Guidelines for the assessment of places for the National Heritage List - 2009
- Standard Commonwealth Heritage Listing process - 2007
- Standard National Heritage Listing process - 2007

== See also ==
- Australasian Underwater Cultural Heritage Database
- Australian Heritage Database
- Historic Shipwrecks Act 1976 – superseded by the Underwater Cultural Heritage Act 2018
