= Alan Williams (immunologist) =

Australian immunologist (1945–1992)

- Born: Alan Frederick Williams
- Known for: Work on Membrane Glycoproteins, immunology, T cells
- Awards: Fellow of the Royal Society (1990)
- Scientific career
- Workplaces: University of Oxford
- Doctoral advisor: William H. Elliott
- Other academic advisors: Rodney Porter

Alan Frederick Williams FRS (25 May 1945 – 9 April 1992) was an Australian immunologist noted for his work on the identification and characterization of cell surface receptors that defined different classes of lymphocytes.

== Education ==
Williams studied agricultural science at Melbourne University in Australia. From there, he went on to perform his graduate work with William Elliott on the topic of avian erythropoiesis.

== Career and research ==
Following his graduate work he moved to the department of Biochemistry at the University of Oxford in the UK to perform post-doctoral studies with Professor Rodney Porter. Following the retirement of Jim Gowans in 1977, Williams took up the mantle as head of the Cellular Immunology Unit (CIU) at the Sir William Dunn School of Pathology, and was due to succeed Henry Harris as head of department before his untimely death in 1992.

It was in the lab of Rodney Porter than he began the seminal work which would exemplify his career, namely the characterization of receptors on B and T lymphocytes. Williams has been credited with several major contributions. His group purified and characterized the Thy1 molecule and from this work came the proposal of the concept of the immunoglobulin superfold. The success linked to this work on Thy1 prompted Williams to expand the search for surface molecules on lymphocytes that could be used to characterize these cells. Establishing a collaboration with Cesar Milstein, who had recently developed hybridoma technology along with Georges Kohler, Williams made a number of discoveries including identification of a cell surface molecule that later proved to be the coreceptor CD4 which identifies helper T cells. Following this his group generated antibodies that identified rat CD8, a marker of cytotoxic T cells as well as rat CD45. His group also demonstrated that Thy1 was retained on the cell surface through a lipid anchor rather than via transmembrane domains, something which had not previously been appreciated but which is now known to be a feature of many receptors.

== Personal life ==
Alan was noted as being a very direct and critical scientist with high standards. Famously, he demolished the office of Professor Jim Gowans to make way for more laboratory space upon taking over as head of the Cellular Immunology Unit.
