= George Mackaness =

Australian professor of microbiology, immunologist (1922–2007)

- Born: 20 August 1922; Sydney, Australia
- Died: 4 March 2007 (aged 84); Charleston, South Carolina, U.S.
- Education: University of Sydney
- Known for: Life history of macrophage; Anti-tuberculous medicines
- Spouse: Gwynneth Patterson (m. 1945)
- Children: 1
- Relatives: George Mackaness (uncle)
- Scientific career
- Workplaces: Sydney Hospital; Sir William Dunn School of Pathology; John Curtin School of Medical Research; Rockefeller Institute; Trudeau Institute; Squibb Institute for Medical Research

George Bellamy Mackaness (20 August 1922 – 4 March 2007) was an Australian professor of microbiology, immunologist, writer and administrator, who researched and described the life history of the macrophage. He showed that by infecting mice with intracellular bacteria, macrophages could be activated to attack other bacteria, triggering further research on "macrophage activation", a term he has come to be associated with.

Mackaness completed his early medical training at Sydney Hospital. After the Second World War he moved to London to study pathology before taking up a graduate post at Howard Florey's Laboratory in Oxford. There he studied the role of monocytes and macrophages in killing Mycobacterium tuberculosis. Simultaneously he worked on anti-tuberculous medicines, including streptomycin and isoniazid, before receiving his DPhil in 1953. Shortly after returning to Australia, Mackeness was appointed acting head of the Department of Experimental Pathology at the John Curtin School of Medical Research (JCSMR), where his observations led him to describe "acquired cellular resistance" and that specifically committed T-cells reacting with antigen, activated the macrophages. He had by this time completed a sabbatical to the Rockefeller Institute, and had written extensively on renin and high blood pressure.

In 1962 he was appointed professor in microbiology at the University of Adelaide. Later, he transferred to the Trudeau Institute in the US before moving to the Squibb Institute for Medical Research, where he played an important part in getting the first ACE inhibitor, captopril, licensed.

== Early life and education ==
George Bellamy Mackaness was born on 20 August 1922 in Sydney, Australia, the third child of James Vincent Mackaness, a Sussex Street grocer, and his wife Eleanor Frances Bellamy Mackaness. He used his name in full to distinguish himself from his uncle, George Mackaness, an author and historian. He attended Fort Street High School, before gaining admission to study medicine at the University of Sydney, from where he graduated with a Bachelor of Medicine, Bachelor of Surgery.

== Early career ==
Mackaness completed a one year residency in medicine at Sydney Hospital followed by a year in pathology at the hospital's Kanematsu Institute, before becoming a demonstrator in pathology. After WWII he moved to London and completed a Diploma in Clinical Pathology (DCP) at the University of London. In 1948 he matriculated from Lincoln College, Oxford.

=== Sir William Dunn School of Pathology ===
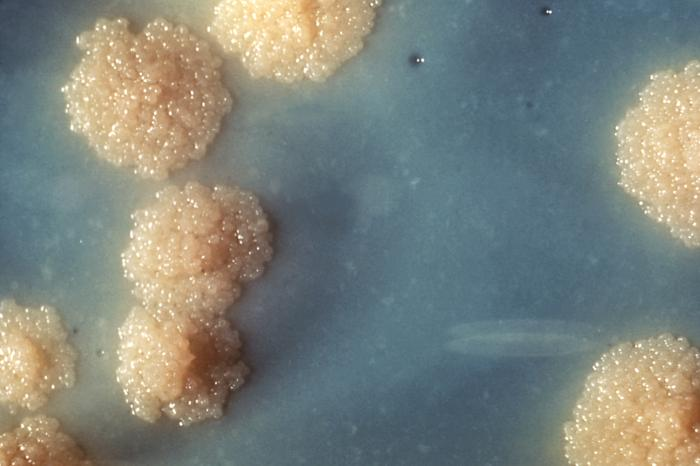
Mycobacterium tuberculosis

Howard Florey offered Mackaness a job in his laboratory at the Sir William Dunn School of Pathology in Oxford. There, Mackeness worked for his DPhil alongside James Learmonth Gowans and later Henry Harris. Mackaness's main study for his thesis was on the role of monocytes and macrophages in killing Mycobacterium tuberculosis. He showed that by infecting mice with intracellular bacteria, macrophages could be activated to attack other bacteria. It resulted in an increase in research on "macrophage activation", a term he has become associated with. Discovering antibiotics was his side interest and his work in this field later earned him a fellowship to the Royal Society. At Florey's suggestion, Mackaness simultaneously took to studying anti-tuberculous medicines, including streptomycin and isoniazid.

His investigations into how isoniazid acted in tuberculosis, published in 1952, were some of the first on this topic. He used the techniques he had developed during his study of the life history of monocytes and macrophages to show that for a drug to be effective against tuberculosis, it had to be effective inside the macrophage, and showed that isoniazid entered the macrophage to be active against M. tuberculosis. He delayed completing his thesis while working on isoniazid and received his DPhil in 1953. A year later, he moved back to Australia.

=== John Curtin School of Medical Research ===
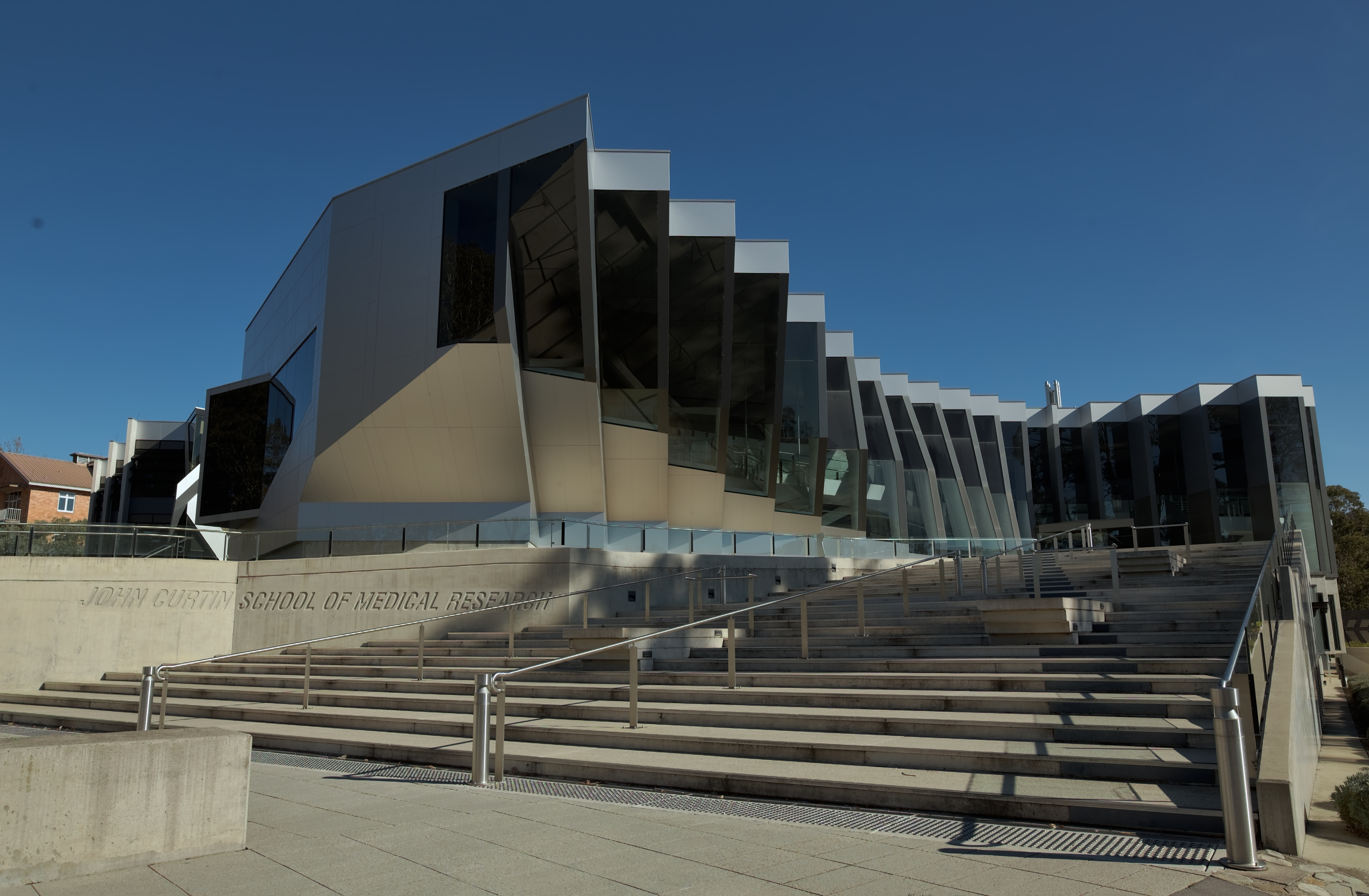
JCSMR Canberra Australia

On returning to Australia, Mackeness moved to Canberra having been appointed to at first staff and then acting head of the Department of Experimental Pathology at the John Curtin School of Medical Research (JCSMR), an institution he saw being planned by Florey while in Oxford.

In 1959 he took a sabbatical to the Rockefeller Institute, by which time he was professorial fellow, having written extensively on renin and hypertension. There he worked with René Dubos, who had worked with Selman Waksman and had a quest to find cures for tuberculosis. Mackeness was set to buddy up with Jim Hirsch and focus on anti-infection immunity. In 1960 they published a paper on the phagocytosis of staphylococci.

While at the JCSMR, he found that mice were good at producing an antibody-independent immune response to the bacteria Listeria monocytogenes. Once infected with L. monocytogenes, the mice developed temporary protection to L. monocytogenes, but also to other bacteria, an observation he termed "acquired cellular resistance", and he attributed this to macrophages. Compared to macrophages from uninfected mice, these macrophages could then be removed and were found to kill several other bacteria. The protection faded with time, but regained when the mice were re-challenged with the original bacteria. The macrophages were activated immediately. When challenged with other un-related bacteria, the macrophages did not respond. He concluded that the macrophage response was dependent on the particular original infection and the findings were published in The Journal of Experimental Medicine in 1962 and 1964. His experiments have since been described as "classic". With his colleagues, he confirmed that specifically committed T-lymphocytes reacting with antigen, activated the macrophages.

=== University of Adelaide ===
His 1962 paper titled "Cellular Resistance to Infection", published in the Journal of Experimental Medicine, played a significant part in earning him a professorship in microbiology at the University of Adelaide.

== Later career ==
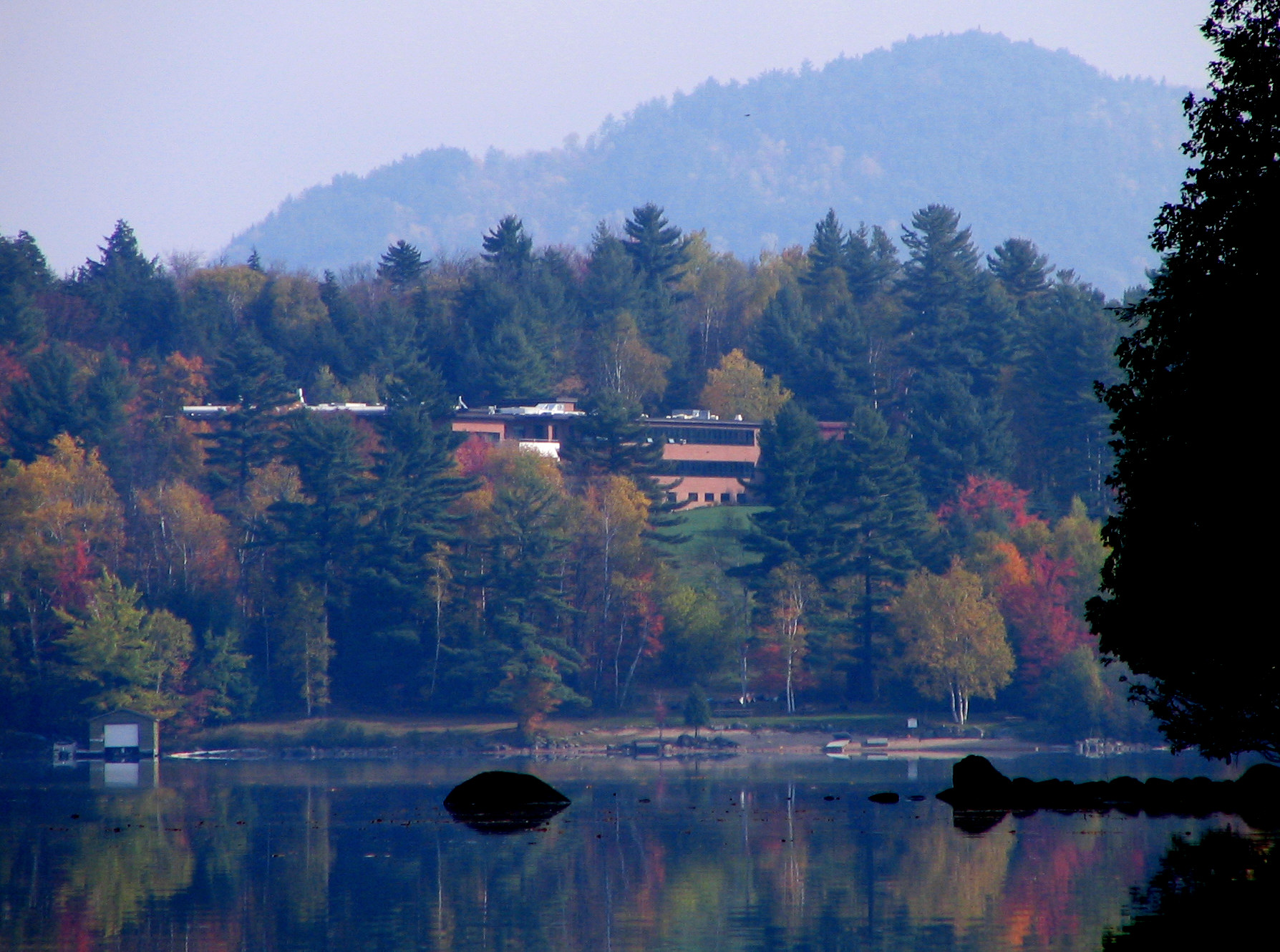
Trudeau Institute Campus

In 1965, he became director of the Trudeau Institute, where over the subsequent ten years he appointed and led staff on work relating to cell-mediated immunity to infection and, later, cancer.

He became president of the Squibb Institute for Medical Research in New Jersey in 1976. While at Squibb, the FDA had denied a license to the first ACE inhibitor, captopril, due the side effects being too unacceptable, particularly the risk of producing a severe low blood count. Mackaness persuaded the company to reduce the dose by half, resulting in FDA approval and significant profits for the Squibb. His last publication before retirement was a review article on ACE inhibitors.

Following retirement in 1985, he moved to Seabrook Island, South Carolina to be near his son and three granddaughters. He later developed Alzheimer's disease.

== Personal and family ==
In 1945, after graduating, Mackaness married Gwynneth Patterson, an army nurse, who he met during the early years of the Second World War, whilst a medical student. They had one son, Miles.

== Awards and honours ==
He was awarded the Paul Ehrlich and Ludwig Darmstaedter Prize in 1975. In 1976, he was elected fellow of the Royal Society. In 1998 he received the Novartis Prizes for Immunology and he was also elected a Fellow of the American Association for the Advancement of Science and a member of the American Academy of Arts and Sciences.

== Death ==
His death on 4 March 2007 in Charleston, South Carolina, at age 84, was followed a few days later by his wife's. Both had spent a year together at the same extended care facility.

== Selected publications ==
- MacKaness, G. B. (July 1952). "The action of drugs on intracellular tubercle bacilli". The Journal of Pathology and Bacteriology. 64 (3): 429–446. doi:10.1002/path.1700640302. ISSN 0368-3494. PMID 12981604.
- MACKANESS G.B.; SMITH N (August 1952). "The action of isoniazid (isonicotinic acid hydrazide) on intracellular tubercle bacilli". American Review of Tuberculosis. 66 (2): 125–133. doi:10.1164/art.1952.66.2.125 (inactive 12 July 2025). ISSN 0096-0381. PMID 14943921. (Co-author)
- MACKANESS GB (October 1959). "The effect of pregnancy and of renin on the blood content of hypertensinogen in rats". British Journal of Experimental Pathology. 40 (5): 424–431. ISSN 0007-1021. PMC 2082310. PMID 14419469.
- MacKaness, G. B. (1 September 1962). "Cellular resistance to infection". The Journal of Experimental Medicine. 116 (3): 381–406. doi:10.1084/jem.116.3.381. ISSN 0022-1007. PMC 2137547. PMID 14467923.
- Mackaness, G. B. (1 July 1964). "The immunological basis of acquired cellular resistance". The Journal of Experimental Medicine. 120 (1): 105–120. doi:10.1084/jem.120.1.105. ISSN 0022-1007. PMC 2137723. PMID 14194388.
- MacKaness, G. B. (1 May 1969). "The influence of immunologically committed lymphoid cells on macrophage activity in vivo". The Journal of Experimental Medicine. 129 (5): 973–992. doi:10.1084/jem.129.5.973. ISSN 0022-1007. PMC 2138649. PMID 4976110.
- MacKaness, G. B. (March 1968). "The immunology of antituberculous immunity". The American Review of Respiratory Disease. 97 (3): 337–344. doi:10.1164/arrd.1968.97.3.337 (inactive 12 July 2025). ISSN 0003-0805. PMID 4966267.
- MacKaness, G. B. (1985). "The future of angiotensin-converting enzyme inhibitors". Journal of Cardiovascular Pharmacology. 7 (Suppl 1): S30–34. doi:10.1097/00005344-198507001-00007. ISSN 0160-2446. PMID 2580173.
