= Fiona Powrie =

Sidney Truelove Professor of Gastroenterology

Dame Fiona Margaret Powrie
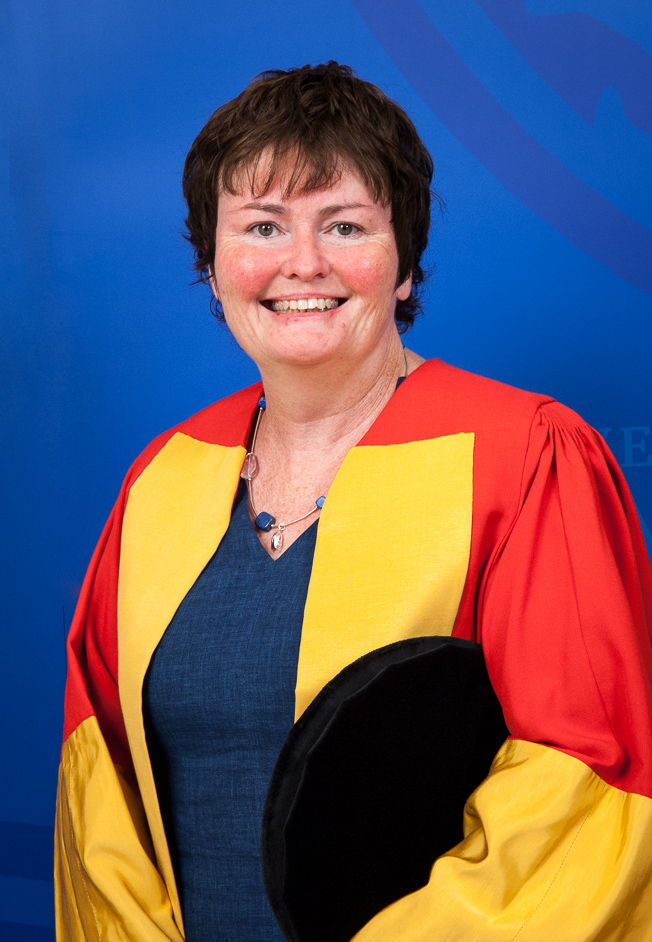
- Born: 1963 (age 62–63); Luton, England
- Education: University of Bath; University of Oxford
- Occupations: Immunologist; biochemist
- Known for: Work on Regulatory T Cells
- Awards: Fellow of the Royal Society (2011, 2011); Ita Askonas Award (2009); Louis-Jeantet Prize for Medicine (2012); Fellow of the Academy of Medical Sciences (2014); Dame Commander of the Order of the British Empire (2022)
- Scientific career
- Workplaces: DNAX Research Institute; The Kennedy Institute of Rheumatology (University of Oxford)
- Thesis: Functional analysis of rat T cell subsets
- Doctoral advisor: Don Mason
- Academic advisors: Robert L. Coffman

Dame Fiona Margaret Powrie DBE FRS FMedSci (born 1963) is currently the head of the Kennedy Institute of Rheumatology at the University of Oxford. Formerly she was the inaugural Sidney Truelove Professor of Gastroenterology at the University of Oxford. She is also head of the Experimental Medicine Division of the Nuffield Department of Clinical Medicine.

== Career ==
Powrie studied biochemistry at the University of Bath, before completing a DPhil degree in Don Mason's lab at the Sir William Dunn School of Pathology, the University of Oxford.

== Notable work ==
=== Regulatory T cells ===
Powrie worked with Don Mason at the Sir William Dunn School of Pathology studying the interactions of different subsets of CD4+ T cells in rats. This work identified that CD4+OX22hi (OX22 is CD45RC in rats and the equivalent of CD45RB in mice, both isoforms of CD45) T cells contained pathogenic activity while CD4+OX22lo T cells contained regulatory activity and could prevent the pathogenic activity of CD4+OX22hi T cells These were foundational studies and represented some of the seminal work on regulatory T cells (Treg).

=== Intestinal inflammation ===
Powrie performed post-doctoral studies with Robert L. Coffman at DNAX in Palo Alto, California. Here, she extended her earlier work in rats to mice and developed the "T cell transfer" model, one of the most prominent models of intestinal inflammation where transfer of CD4+CD45RBhi T cells to Rag deficient or SCID mice led to the development of severe intestinal inflammation and wasting disease. This could be prevented by transfer of CD4+CD45RBlo T cells. Using this model Powrie further identified the pathogenic role played by IFN-γ and TNF-α in intestinal inflammation and the therapeutic potential of IL-10 and highlighted the requirement for TGF-β in the prevention of colitis by the CD4+CD45RBlo regulatory T cell subset Upon returning to the University of Oxford in 1996, first to the Nuffield Department of Surgery and later, the Sir William Dunn School of Pathology, Powrie used the T cell transfer model to identify the suppressive mechanisms used by regulatory T cells to prevent intestinal inflammation including the requirements for CTLA-4 and the capacity of Treg to prevent colitis driven by innate immune cells as well as CD4+ T cells. Focusing on pathogenic mechanisms the Powrie lab. identified the critical role played by the cytokine IL-23 in driving pathology in the intestine

=== Therapeutic potential of Tregs ===
Work from the Powrie lab. identified that Treg could not alone prevent inflammatory bowel disease but could actually cure established inflammation. Furthermore, Powrie was among the first to identify a population of CD4+CD25+ T cells in human peripheral blood that possessed regulatory capacity, confirming these cells as a bona fide T cell subset in humans.

== Honours and awards ==
In 2009, Powrie was appointed as the inaugural Sidney Truelove Professor of Gastroenterology within the Nuffield Department of Clinical Medicine in Oxford. She was elected a Fellow of the Royal Society in 2011, and was awarded the Louis-Jeantet Prize for Medicine in 2012. In 2014, she was elected a Fellow of the Academy of Medical Sciences.

The University of Bath awarded Powrie an Honorary Doctorate of Science in June 2015.

Powrie was appointed Dame Commander of the Order of the British Empire (DBE) in the 2022 Birthday Honours for services to medical science.
