= New South Wales State Heritage Register =

Heritage list of places in New South Wales, Australia

- NSW State Heritage Register
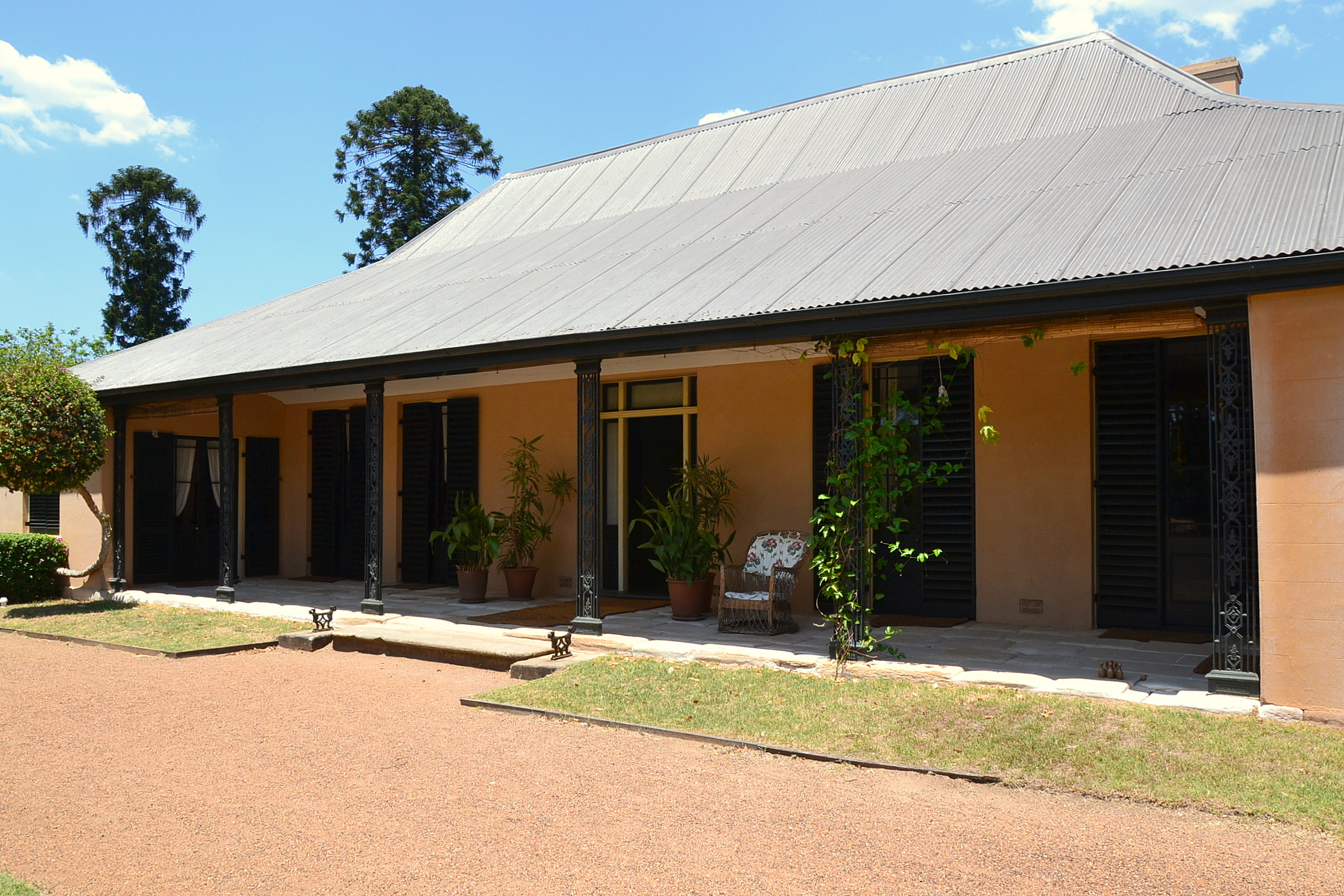
- Elizabeth Farm, the first item inscribed on the Register
- Type: Natural and cultural heritage register
- State: New South Wales, Australia
- Status: Active
- Years: 2 April 1999 – present
- Legislation: Heritage Act 1977 (NSW)
- Compiled by: Heritage NSW and the Heritage Council of New South Wales

The New South Wales State Heritage Register, also known as NSW State Heritage Register, is a heritage list of places in the state of New South Wales, Australia, that are protected by New South Wales legislation, generally covered by the Heritage Act 1977 and its 2010 amendments. The register is administered by the Heritage Council of NSW via Heritage NSW, a division of the New South Wales government's Department of Planning and Environment.

The register was created in 1999 and includes items protected by heritage schedules that relate to the State, and to regional and to local environmental plans. As a result, the register contains over 20,000 statutory-listed items in either public or private ownership of historical, cultural, and architectural value. Of those items listed, approximately 1,785 items are listed as significant items for the whole of New South Wales; with the remaining items of local or regional heritage value. The items include buildings, objects, monuments, Aboriginal places, gardens, bridges, landscapes, archaeological sites, shipwrecks, relics, bridges, streets, industrial structures and conservation precincts.

Typically, an item will first attract local listing, then regional or State listing. If the item is of significance to the nation, the State will advocate for listing on the Australian National Heritage List or the Commonwealth Heritage List. If the item is of global significance, the Australian Government will advocate for the item to be listed on the UNESCO World Heritage List.

== Heritage Council ==
The Heritage Council of New South Wales, a statutory body appointed by the NSW Government and comprising members of the community, the government, the conservation profession and representatives of organisations such as the National Trust of Australia, makes decisions about the care and protection of heritage places and items that have been identified as being significant to the people of NSW. The Council provides advice on heritage matters to the Minister for Environment and Heritage. The Council recommends to the Minister places and objects for listing on the State Heritage Register.

The work of the Council and the State Heritage Register is generally covered by the Act, 1977 / {{{4}}} (NSW) and its 2010 amendments. Under section 170 of the act, government agencies in New South Wales are required to compile a register of heritage assets and look after their assets on behalf of the community. The National Parks and Wildlife Act 1974 preserves Aboriginal heritage.

== Criteria ==
Items nominated for listing on the register are assessed against the State Heritage Register criteria to determine the level of significance. To be assessed for listing on the State Heritage Register an item will, in the opinion of the Heritage Council of NSW, meet one or more of the following criteria:

a) an item is important in the course, or pattern, of NSW's cultural or natural history;
b) an item has strong or special association with the life or works of a person, or group of persons, of importance in NSW's cultural or natural history;
c) an item is important in demonstrating aesthetic characteristics or a high degree of creative or technical achievement in NSW;
d) an item has strong or special association with a particular community or cultural group in NSW for social, cultural or spiritual reasons;
e) an item has potential to yield information that will contribute to an understanding of NSW's cultural or natural history;
f) an item possesses uncommon, rare or endangered aspects of NSW's cultural or natural history;
g) an item is important in demonstrating the principal characteristics of a class of NSW's:

– cultural or natural places; or
– cultural or natural environments.

An item is not to be excluded from the Register on the ground that items with similar characteristics have already been listed on the Register.

== See also ==
- Australian Heritage Database
- National Trust of Australia (New South Wales)
