= Underwater Cultural Heritage Act 2018 =

Australian Act of Parliament to protect sunken craft and artefacts

Parliament of Australia
- Long title: An Act to protect Australia’s underwater cultural heritage, and for related purposes
- Citation: Act No. 85 of 2018
- Territorial extent: Australia (including the external Territories) and the territorial sea of Australia and waters of the sea (not being State waters) on the landward side of the territorial sea of Australia.
- Enacted by: Parliament of Australia
- Enacted: 24 August 2018

Related legislation
- Underwater Cultural Heritage Act 2018 (Protected Zones) Declaration Instrument 2019; Underwater Cultural Heritage (Consequential and Transitional Provisions) Act 2018
- Status: In force

The Underwater Cultural Heritage Act 2018 is an Australian Act of Parliament designed "to protect shipwrecks, sunken aircraft and their associated artefacts, that occurred 75 or more years ago, regardless of whether their location is known". Other underwater heritage items, and more recent shipwrecks or aircraft, may be protected through a declaration under the Underwater Heritage Act, and some sites also have a protected zone around them. The federal government works in collaboration with State and Territory Government agencies to protect and conserve Australia's underwater heritage.

== Coverage ==
The Australian government collaborates with the states and Northern Territory works to protect the underwater heritage.

=== Vessels ===
The remains of vessels that have been in Australian waters for at least 75 years are automatically protected, along with certain articles associated with them. Australian waters extend from the seaward limits of a State to the outer limit of Australia's continental shelf.

=== Aircraft ===
The remains of aircraft and certain associated articles that have been in Commonwealth waters for at least 75 years are also automatically protected. Commonwealth waters extend from waters 3 nautical miles seaward of the baseline of the territorial sea that are adjacent to the States and the Northern Territory; and to the outer limit of Australia's continental shelf. (Commonwealth waters thus exclude the coastal waters of a State or the Northern Territory.)

=== Other ===
Other kinds of articles can be protected if the Minister deems them of cultural heritage significance. Such articles may be in Commonwealth waters, Australian waters, in waters beyond Australian waters, or even removed from the water.

== Effect on other legislation ==
Related legislation, the Underwater Cultural Heritage (Consequential and Transitional Provisions) Act 2018 formally repeals the Historic Shipwrecks Act 1976, and makes minor amendments to the Australian Heritage Council Act 2003, the Navigation Act 2012, the Protection of the Sea (Powers of Intervention) Act 1981 and the Sea Installations Act 1987.

== Historic shipwreck protected zones ==
The Act, along with its associated Underwater Cultural Heritage Act 2018 (Protected Zones) Declaration Instrument 2019, also provides for an area around protected underwater heritage to be declared a protected zone. The size of these zones may vary depending on the site. Most cover an area of around 200 hectares (490 acres), but a larger area may be declared around sites that are widely spread.

The following historic shipwrecks lie within protected or no-entry zones declared under the Act:

- Aarhus
- SS Alert
- Bega
- Cato
- AHS Centaur
- Clonmel
- SMS Emden
- Foam
- Florence D
- SS Glenelg
- SS Gothenburg
- HSK Kormoran
- Lady Darling
- Llewellyn
- Submarine M24
- HMCS Mermaid
- HMS Pandora
- HMS Porpoise
- Sanyo Maru
- Submarine I-124
- HMAS Sydney
- SS Yongala
- VOC Zuytdorp

== Other archaeological sites ==
After the discovery and investigation of 269 highly significant Aboriginal Australian artefacts as well as an underwater spring at two underwater sites off the Burrup Peninsula (Murujuga) in Western Australia between 2016 and 2020, with the site placed on the WA Aboriginal Heritage List, the question of automatic listing of such sites (which does not occur under the current Act) was raised by lead archaeologist Jonathan Benjamin of Flinders University. A spokesman for Federal Environment Minister Sussan Ley did not say whether the Government would consider amending the Act to give automatic protection of such sites.

== See also ==
- ANCODS - old Dutch shipwrecks off Western Australia
- Australasian Underwater Cultural Heritage Database - online database of protected items
