= Aarhus Historic Shipwreck =

Shipwreck in Queensland, Australia

Coordinates: 27°00′14.31″S 153°26′27.92″E

History
- Builder: Hamburg
- Launched: 1875
- Fate: Sank on 24 February 1894

General characteristics
- Class & type: barque
- Tonnage: 668 GRT
- Length: 170 feet (52 m)

In Australia, Aarhus Historic Shipwreck is a historical site preserving one of the victims of Smith's Rock. The Aarhus was a 668-ton sailing barque built in 1875 in Hamburg, Germany. The vessel measured 170 feet (52 m) in length.

While carrying a general cargo including kerosene from New York to Brisbane, Australia, they hit Smith's Rock, which lies about two nautical miles (4 km) north-east of Cape Moreton, and sank on 24 February 1894.

The remains of the ship now lie upright in 20 metres of water, though most of the ship has been reduced to plates and ribs sticking out of the sand. It has been gazetted under Section 7 of the Historic Shipwrecks Act 1976 which provides for a special protected zone of 200m around the wreck. The Historic Shipwrecks Act 1976 was superseded in 2019 with the Underwater Cultural Heritage Act 2018 Any disturbance activity is prohibited; divers are required to apply to the Department of the Environment and Science (QLD State) for a permit to access the wreck.

This site has much interesting sea-life, from small to large batfish at cleaning stations everywhere. Another point of interest is the large mast-like object that is actually the bowsprit. This area reportedly has a cat shark inhabiting the bowsprit and a large wobbegong shark under the scoured out section. The site can have very good visibility but a strong current makes it hard to see the entire wreck in one dive.

== See also ==
- Lists of shipwrecks
