= Australian Heritage Database =

Online database of Australian heritage sites

The Australian Heritage Database is a searchable online database of heritage sites in Australia. It is maintained by the Department of Agriculture, Water and the Environment as of 2022, in consultation with Australian Heritage Council. There are more than 20,000 entries in the database, which includes natural, historic and Indigenous heritage places, held in separately maintained lists.

== Description ==
Included in the database are places or items:

- the World Heritage List, places that are of outstanding universal value and have been included on this United Nations Educational, Scientific and Cultural Organisation (UNESCO) managed list;
- the National Heritage List, a long list of natural, historic and Indigenous places that are of outstanding national heritage value to the Australian nation;
- the Commonwealth Heritage List, a list of natural, historic and Indigenous places of heritage significance owned or controlled by the Australian Government;
- the Register of the National Estate, a list of natural, historic and Indigenous heritage places throughout Australia, frozen in February 2007 and replaced by the Australian National Heritage List and the Commonwealth Heritage List;
- the List of Overseas Places of Historic Significance (LOPHSA), a list which recognises symbolically sites of outstanding historic significance to Australia that are located outside the Australian jurisdiction; and
- other places being considered for listing in one of these lists.

== Photographs ==
Photographs of listed places are included (if available) through links to the Australian Heritage Photographic Library. There is a separate search facility for searching the photos only.

== See also ==
- Australasian Underwater Cultural Heritage Database – shipwrecks, sunken aircraft and other types of underwater heritage sites and artefacts
- Australian Heritage Council – principal adviser to the Australian Government on heritage matters
- List of heritage registers (worldwide)
- List of Overseas Places of Historic Significance to Australia
