= Don Mason (immunologist) =

British immunologist and professor (1934–2021)

- Born: 1934
- Died: 13 January 2021 (aged 86–87)
- Citizenship: British
- Known for: Work on Regulatory T Cells
- Scientific career
- Institutions: Atomic Energy Research Establishment, Sir William Dunn School of Pathology, University of Oxford

Donald W. Mason (1934 – 13 January 2021) was a British immunologist and professor of immunology in the MRC Cellular Immunology Unit at the Sir William Dunn School of Pathology at the University of Oxford. Professor Mason is best known for his work on regulatory T cells and their role in preventing autoimmunity. His distinction was recognised by his election in 2017 to honorary life membership of the British Society for Immunology.

== Notable work ==
Although Mason began his research career as a physicist studying controlled thermonuclear fusion, he is best known for his work on cellular immunology, summarised in outline here. Mason's most important contributions to immunology were his studies defining the existence, cell surface phenotype and function of regulatory T cells. Mason's research identified the immuno-regulatory capacity of a population of CD4+ T cells that express low levels of OX22 (an isoform of CD45: CD45RC in rats and CD45RB in mice) and their capacity to prevent the pathogenic activity of the OX22hi subset. While he carried out studies into multiple sclerosis, the work for which he is most recognised focused mainly on the role of Tregs in the prevention of diabetes and thyroiditis and highlighted the role for the thymus in the development of Tregs. These were among the earliest demonstrations of the requirement for Treg in restraining the pathogenic activity of CD4+ T cells and prevention of autoimmunity. Mason retired from research in 1999.

== Personal life ==
Mason was a vegan and a Quaker. He became a vegan in 1977. In 2006, he authored Science, Mystical Experience and Religious Belief: A Personal View. This contains his reflections on the scope and limitations of science, and his contemplations of "The Broader View".

Mason died aged 86 on 13 January 2021.

== Selected publications ==
- Science, Mystical Experience and Religious Belief: A Personal View (2006)
