= James Learmonth Gowans =

British immunologist (1924–2020)

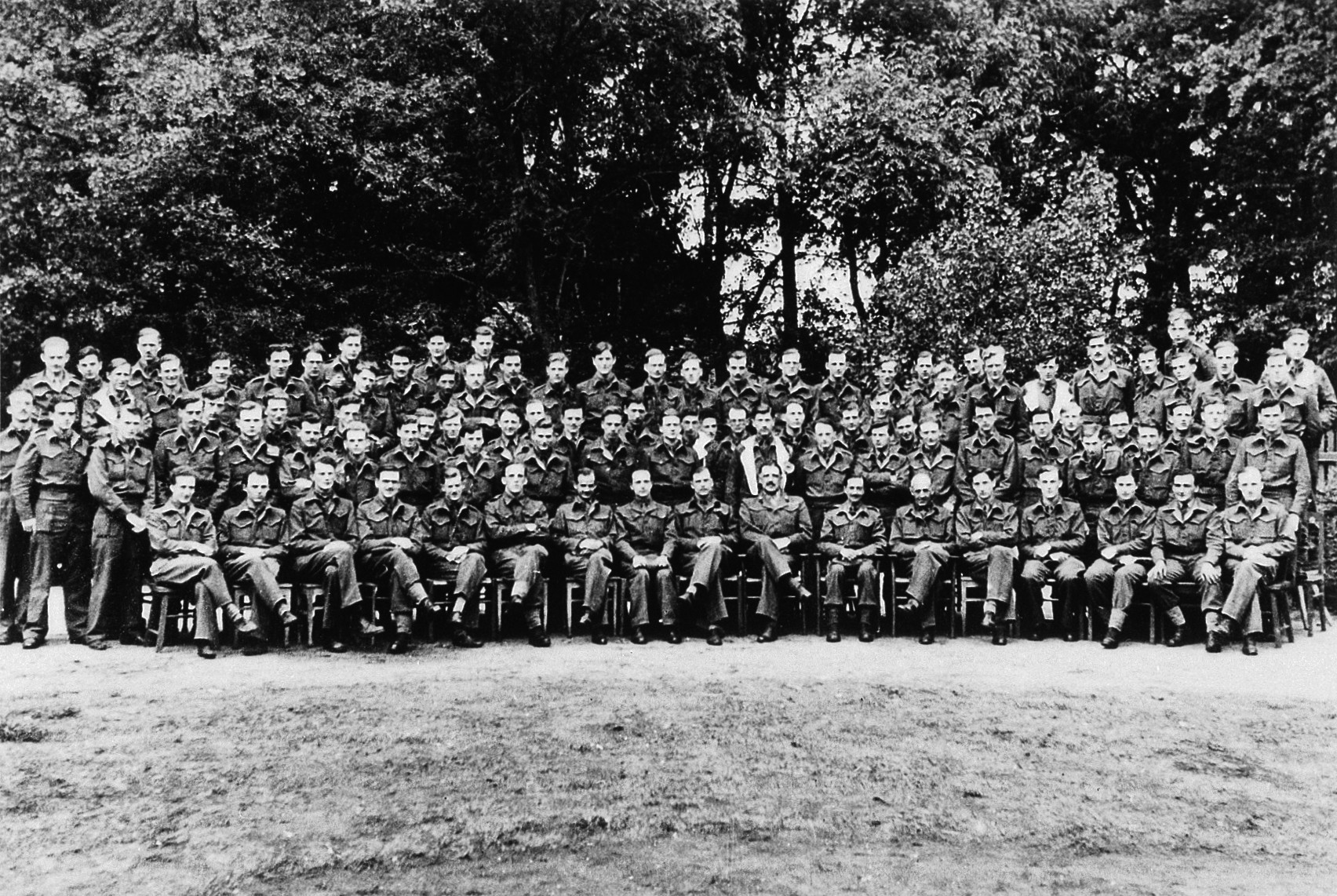
Group photo of London Medical students who went to Belsen

Sir James Learmonth "Jim" Gowans CBE FRS FRCP (7 May 1924 – 1 April 2020) was a British physician and immunologist. In 1945, while studying medicine at King's College Hospital, he assisted at the liberated Bergen-Belsen concentration camp as a voluntary medical student.

== Biography ==
Gowans was born in Sheffield, England. He graduated in medicine in 1947 from King's College Hospital, then in 1948 obtained a degree in physiology at Oxford, followed by a Ph.D. with Howard Florey at the Sir William Dunn School of Pathology at Oxford on lymphocytes. He then became a professor of experimental pathology at Oxford. In 1977, he left his research career for ten years to be secretary of the Medical Research Council. He served as Secretary-General of the Human Frontier Science Program in 1989. He was a colleague and life-long friend of George Bellamy Mackaness.

He made significant discoveries about the role of lymphocytes in the immune response. In particular, he showed that some lymphocytes were not short-lived, as previously assumed, but moved from the blood into the lymphatic system and back. On the initiative of Peter Medawar he also undertook experiments on rats that showed that lymphocytes play an important role in transplant rejection.

== Honours and recognition ==
In 1963, Gowans became a Fellow of the Royal Society. He was appointed a Commander of the Order of the British Empire in the 1971 New Year Honours for services to medical science and a Knight Bachelor in the 1982 New Year Honours.

In 1975, Gowans was named an honorary member of the American Association for Anatomy.

In 1980, he was awarded the Wolf Prize in Medicine. He was a foreign member of the National Academy of Sciences and a SSI Honorary Member (1971), and received several honorary doctorates. In 1968 he received the Gairdner Foundation International Award and in 1990 shared the first Medawar Prize with Jacques Miller. In 1974, he was awarded the Paul Ehrlich and Ludwig Darmstaedter Prize. He won the Royal Medal in 1976. In 1998, he was an inaugural Fellow of the Academy of Medical Sciences.

== Family ==
In 1956, he married Moira Leatham, with whom he had a son and two daughters.

== See also ==
- List of London medical students who assisted at Belsen
