= List of heritage-listed buildings in Burra =

This is a list of heritage-listed buildings in Burra, South Australia:

- 1 Bests Place: Royal Exchange Hotel
- Bridge Terrace: Unicorn Brewery Cellars and Wall
- Burra Mine Area: Burra Mine Manager's Dwelling and Office
- Burra Mine Area: Burra Mine Area Engine and Crusher House
- Burra Mine Area: Burra Mine Area Winding House
- Burra Mine Area: Crusher Chimney (Cornish)
- Burra Mine Area: Graves Pump House
- Burra Mine Area: Burra Mine Area Powder Magazine
- Burra Mine Area: Morphett's Pump House
- Burra Mine Area: Burra Mine Area Ore Sorting Floor
- Burra Mine Area: Haulage Engine Chimney (Welsh)
- Burra Road: Princess Royal Station Coach House, Stables and Gate
- Burra Road: Princess Royal Homestead
- 5-11A Chapel Street: Barker of Baldina Homes
- 19-27 Chapel Street: McBride Cottages
- Commercial Street: Commercial Street and Ware Street Stone Walls
- Commercial Street: Kooringa Bridge
- 21 Commercial Street: Drew and Crewe's Store
- 22 Commercial Street: Commercial Hotel
- 39 Commercial Street: 1840s Timber Dwelling
- Helston Street: Redruth Police Station, Cells and Stables
- 2 Kangaroo Street and 1A Ware Street: John and Essington Lewis' House and Coach House
- Kingston Street: Burra Bible Christian Chapel
- Kingston Street: Paxton Square Cottages
- 4 Kingston Street: Kooringa Hotel
- 11 Kingston Street: Burra Salvation Army Citadel
- Ludgvan Street: Redruth Bridge
- Market Square: Market Square Rotunda
- Market Square: Burra War Memorial
- 5 Market Square: Burra Hotel
- Market Street: St Mary's Anglican Church Hall
- Market Street: Peacock's Chimney (Cornish)
- Market Street: Burra Mines Historic Site
- Market Street: St Mary's Anglican Church
- Market Street: South Australian Mining Association Storeman's Dwelling
- Market Street: Burra Town Hall
- Market Street: South Australian Mining Association Store Room, Yard and Walls
- Market Street: Mine Bridge Abutments and Wall
- 1 Market Street: National Australia Bank Burra Agency
- 3 Market Street: Dwelling
- 5 Market Street: Burra Post and Telegraph Office
- 26 Market Street: Smelter's Home Hotel
- Mitchell Flat: Miners' Dugouts, Tributary of Burra Creek
- Mitchell Flat: Miners' Dugouts, Burra Creek
- Railway Terrace: Burra railway station
- Railway Terrace: Bon Accord Mine Site
- Sanscreed Street: Redruth Courthouse
- Smelts Road: Burra Community School
- Smelts Road: Burra Smelts Historic Site
- Smelts Road: Burra Smeltsyard and Storehouse
- Spring Street: Burra Cemetery
- Springbank Road: Old Koonoona Homestead
- 9 St Just Street: Smelts Superintendent's Dwelling and Wall
- Tregony Street: Redruth Gaol
- 8, 10, 12, 14, 16 and 18 Truro Street: Tiver's Row
- 9, 11, 13 Truro Street: Attached Cottages
- Upper Thames Street: South Australian Mining Association Dwellings, Upper Thames Street
- 9 Upper Thames Street: Burra Primitive Methodist Church
- 16 Upper Thames Street: Dwelling
- Vineyard Terrace: Heathmont
- Burra: Burra State Heritage Area
- Burra: Hampton Township Precinct
