= Historic Shipwrecks Act 1976 =

Australian legislation

Parliament of Australia
- Long title: An Act relating to the Protection of Certain Shipwrecks and Relics of Historic Significance
- Citation: No. 190 of 1976
- Territorial extent: States and territories of Australia
- Enacted by: Parliament of Australia
- Enacted: 15 December 1976
- Repealed: 24 August 2018

Repealed by
- Underwater Cultural Heritage (Consequential and Transitional Provisions) Act 2018
- Status: Repealed

The Historic Shipwrecks Act 1976 was an Act of the Parliament of Australia which legally protected historic shipwrecks and any relics or artefacts from those wrecks.

== The Act ==
The Act automatically affects all shipwrecks that meet the "historic" criteria (generally defined as vessels more than 75 years old, although newer ships with historic value may be placed under the Act) and are in Australian Commonwealth waters (between the low-tide mark and the edge of the continental shelf): complementary state and territory legislation protects shipwrecks in state and territory waters including rivers and bays. Of the estimated 8,000 shipwrecks in Australian waters, more than 6,500 are protected under this legislation.

Most shipwrecks under the act can be accessed by the public, although no items may be removed from the wreck site without permission, and divers must take care not to damage or disturb the wreck. Any items removed from a protected wreck (including those removed before the Act came into effect) must be listed on a database maintained by the Federal department responsible for maintaining and preserving Australia's cultural heritage (the Department of the Environment and Energy). As of 2011, over 500,000 artefacts and relics are listed and recognised. Anyone disturbing a protected shipwreck can be fined up to A$10,000, or imprisoned for a maximum of five years.

The Act was repealed by the provision of assent on 24 August 2018 to the Underwater Cultural Heritage Act 2018 which commenced on 1 July 2019.

== Historic shipwreck protected zones ==
Shipwrecks can be placed within an exclusion zone with a radius up to 800 metres (2,600 ft) where there can be no activities in or through this zone without formal permission. The following historic shipwrecks lie within protected or no-entry zones declared under the Act:

- Aarhus
- SS Alert
- Bega
- Cato
- AHS Centaur
- Clonmel
- SMS Emden
- Foam
- Florence D
- SS Glenelg
- SS Gothenburg
- HSK Kormoran
- Lady Darling
- Llewellyn
- Submarine M24
- HMCS Mermaid
- HMS Pandora
- HMS Porpoise
- Sanyo Maru
- Submarine I-124
- HMAS Sydney
- SS Yongala
- VOC Zuytdorp

== Complementary legislation ==
The following legislation complements the Act within waters under the direct control of the States and the Northern Territory:

- New South Wales: Heritage Act 1977
- Northern Territory: Heritage Conservation Act 1991
- Queensland: Queensland Heritage Act 1992
- South Australia: Historic Shipwrecks Act 1981 and Heritage Places Act 1993
- Tasmania: Historic Cultural Heritage Act 1995
- Victoria: Heritage Act 1995 and Heritage Historic Shipwrecks General Regulations 1996
- Western Australia: Maritime Archaeology Act 1973

== See also ==
- ANCODS
- Australasian Underwater Cultural Heritage Database
