= Australasian Underwater Cultural Heritage Database =

Online database containing data about shipwrecks and other sunken cultural artefacts

The Australasian Underwater Cultural Heritage Database (AUCHD) is an online, searchable database containing data on shipwrecks, aircraft that have been submerged underwater or wrecked on the shore, and other artefacts of cultural significance which are or have been underwater. It includes what used to be called the Australian National Shipwreck Database (ANSDB), originally developed by the Australasian Institute of Maritime Archaeology in December 2009, now significantly expanded to include other objects. The database was hosted and maintained by the Department of the Environment and Energy until the environment functions of that department, including AUCHD, were taken over by the Department of Agriculture, Water and the Environment on 1 February 2020.

It comprises historical and environmental information about objects currently or previously located underwater in the Oceania and Southeast Asian regions. It includes images, the ability to link shipwrecks to artefacts recovered from their sites, site information for divers and site managers, data about passengers and crew, as well as details about the technical specifications and history of the ships. All data is also searchable by people, places and themes.

Approved researchers may be recruited from the public and provided with access to edit or create records.

The AUCHD also serves as the register of protected underwater cultural heritage for the Underwater Cultural Heritage Act 2018 (the UCH Act), which provides a means whereby the public can submit notifications and permit applications required under the UCH Act. Shipwrecks, sunken aircraft and other types of underwater heritage and their associated artefacts are protected through the Act, which is administered in collaboration between the Commonwealth and the States, Northern Territory and Norfolk Island.

The database is included in the Department's "Heritage places and lists" along with other heritage databases which form part of the Australian Heritage Database, but the database and its search facility are separate.

== See also ==
- Historic Shipwrecks Act 1976
