= Sir William Dunn School of Pathology =

Department in the University of Oxford

Coordinates: 51.7595°N 1.2515°W

Location of Sir William Dunn School of Pathology within central Oxford

The Sir William Dunn School of Pathology is an academic department of the Medical Sciences Division at the University of Oxford in Oxford, England, United Kingdom.

The school's research programme includes the cellular and molecular biology of pathogens, the immune response, cancer and cardiovascular disease. It teaches undergraduate and graduate courses in the medical sciences. The school is named for Sir William Dunn, 1st Baronet, of Lakenheath, whose will provided the initial funding. It is located towards the east end of South Parks Road, to the north of the city centre.

== History ==
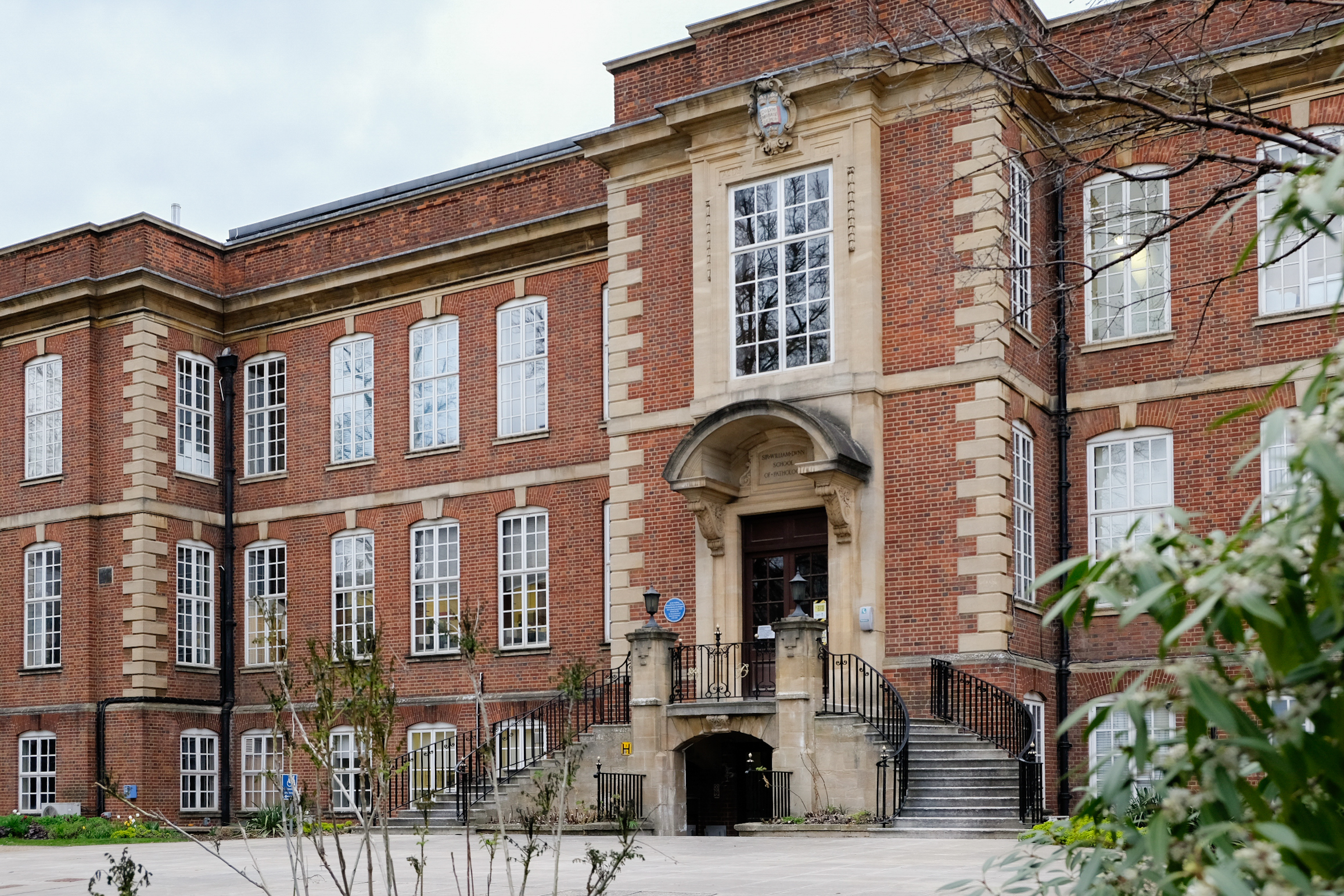
Sir William Dunn School of Pathology, 2021

The first course of Pathology teaching in the University of Oxford was given in 1894 by Professor John Burdon Sanderson, Professor of Physiology, (Regius Professor of Medicine from 1895 to 1905), and Dr James Ritchie, who, in 1897, was appointed as the first University Lecturer in Pathology.

The first Department of Pathology was opened in 1901 and functioned until 1927 when it was handed over to Pharmacology on completion of the new purpose-built Sir William Dunn School of Pathology. This had been made possible by a munificent benefaction of £100,000, made in 1922 by the Trustees set up in the will of Sir William Dunn who died in 1912.

The first full Professor of Pathology, Georges Dreyer, a Dane, was appointed in 1907 and remained in post until he died in 1934. He had a mathematical bent and carried out some of the earliest quantitative assays on immunological reactions to infection. His special interest was in the immunology of enteric infections and tuberculosis and he was deeply involved in efforts to produce vaccines for these diseases. He was responsible for the design and manufacture of the earliest oxygen masks worn by pilots in WWI.

He was succeeded in 1935 by Howard Walter Florey an Australian. Florey was a physiologist by training and was dedicated to the application of physiological and chemical methods to pathology. His main interests were in the physiology of the cells in the gut, inflammatory reactions and atherosclerosis. He is, however, best known for the work done under his direction that demonstrated the therapeutic value of penicillin and thus ushered in the age of antibiotics. The purification of penicillin was achieved by Ernst Chain, Norman Heatley and Edward Abraham, with Chain and Abraham eventually developing a theoretical model for its chemical structure, which was later confirmed by Dorothy Hodgkin using X-ray crystallography.

The textbook, General Pathology, based on the preclinical course at the Dunn School, was first published in 1954, and went through four editions. For many years it was the international standard text on the subject.

After penicillin, the work on antibiotics was continued in the Dunn School by Abraham and Guy Newton, who during the 1950s discovered, purified and established the structure of cephalosporin C, the first of the cephalosporin family of antibiotics. This compound and the ring structure on which it was based were patented, and both Newton and Abraham set up trusts out of the royalties that they received. The Edward Penley Abraham Research Fund, the EPA Cephalosporin Fund and the Guy Newton Research Fund are dedicated to the support of medical, biological and chemical research in the Dunn School, Lincoln College and the University of Oxford.

Florey was succeeded as Professor in 1963 by Henry Harris, another expatriate Australian, who had arrived in Oxford in 1952 to do a DPhil under Florey's supervision. Harris's main interest was in cell biology and especially what was later to become the science of somatic cell genetics. With John Watkins he developed the technique of cell fusion for the study of the physiology and genetics of higher cells. They demonstrated that cell fusion provided a general method for the amalgamation of different cell types across the barriers imposed by species differences and by the process of differentiation. This technique was one of the main roots of somatic cell genetics and, in due course, resulted in the production of monoclonal antibodies.

It was also by means of cell fusion that Harris and Goss devised the first systematic method for determining the order of genes along the human chromosome and the distances between them. In 1969 Harris, collaborating with George Klein in Stockholm, showed that when a wide range of malignant tumour cells were fused with normal fibroblasts, the resulting hybrids were not malignant and had the morphological character of fibroblasts. This meant that there were normal genes that had the ability to suppress malignancy. These genes are now known as tumour suppressor genes and work on them has become a world-wide industry. Harris's research was supported mainly by what is now Cancer Research UK, (originally The British Empire Cancer Campaign, BECC, and then The Cancer Research Campaign, CRC.)

In 1977 Gowans, see below, was replaced as Honorary Director of the MRC Cellular Immunology Research Unit by Alan F. Williams, yet another Australian. Williams was mainly concerned with the structural and biochemical aspects of immunological reactions and developed the concept of the immunoglobulin superfamily. In 1992 Williams was elected to succeed Harris as Professor of Pathology but died before he was able to take up the chair.

The former Head of department, Herman Waldmann, was appointed in 1994. Waldmann's principal interest is in the study of immunological tolerance and application of immunology to the clinic. Professor Matthew Freeman, FRS, became Head of Department in January 2013.

In 2007 Howard Florey's Laboratory was proclaimed by the Australian Government as one of the first three sites on the List of Overseas Places of Historic Significance to Australia.

== Scientists ==
- James Ritchie (1864-1923): first University lecturer in Pathology in Oxford, 1897. Organised the first undergraduate courses in Pathology and Bacteriology. Helped to fund and build first University department of Pathology in Oxford (1901). Edited standard texts in both Bacteriology (with Muir) and Pathology (with Pembrey). Founder member and first Secretary of the Pathological Society of GB and I. Left Oxford to return to Edinburgh in 1906.
- Ernest Ainley-Walker (1871-1955): elected to a fellowship in University College in 1903, the first ‘medical tutor’ in any Oxford College. Published a textbook of Pathology in 1904. Acting Head of Pathology Department when Ritchie left and on several occasions when Dreyer was absent. Also appointed as first Dean of Oxford Medical School from 1922.
- A. Duncan Gardner (1884-1978): invited to Oxford in 1915 to set up MRC Bacteriological Standards laboratory with Dreyer. Remained in Pathology until his retirement in 1958. Regius Professor of Medicine 1948–56.
- Sir Peter Medawar (1915-1987): graduate student with Howard Florey 1936–9; the Nobel Prize in Physiology or Medicine 1960 "for discovery of acquired immunological tolerance"
- Sir John E. Walker (1941-): graduate student with Edward Abraham 1965–9; the Nobel Prize in Chemistry 1997 "for the elucidation of the enzymatic mechanism underlying the synthesis of adenosine triphosphate (ATP)". Now Director of the MRC Dunn Human Nutrition Unit in Cambridge.
- George Brownlee: Professor of Chemical Pathology (1978-2008). Cloned and expressed human clotting factor IX, providing a recombinant source of this protein for Haemophilia B patients who had previously relied on the hazardous blood-derived product. With Peter Palese and co-workers, developed the first "reverse genetics" system for influenza virus, markedly speeding up the process of developing flu vaccines
- James L. Gowans: Gowans came to Oxford in 1948 and after getting a 1st in the Physiological Sciences Honours School he researched for a DPhil on new antibiotics under Florey. But after a period working in the Pasteur Institute in Paris he decided to pursue immunological research. Florey suggested he should investigate the lymphocyte, a cell whose life history was at that time completely obscure. During the 1950s Gowans pioneering work sorted out the life cycle of that cell, He showed that the small lymphocyte continuously recirculated from the blood to the lymph and back again to the blood. He also demonstrated that this cell was at the centre of immunological responses. Shortly after he had been elected to the Henry Dale Professorship of the Royal Society (1962) the Medical Research Council established, in the Dunn School, A Cellular Immunology Research Unit, under the honorary direction of Gowans, and this led to the construction of an additional building, (the Leslie Martin building). Gowans remained the Honorary Director of the Unit until he moved, in 1977, to become the Secretary of the Medical Research Council.
- Alan Williams: Succeeded Gowans as Director of the MRC Cellular Immunology Unit in 1977. With Cesar Milstein in Cambridge, he was the first to use monoclonal antibody technology to analyse molecular composition of the cell surface, and in doing so identified CD4 for the first time.
- Elizabeth Robertson FRS is a British scientist based at the Sir William Dunn School of Pathology, University of Oxford. She is Professor of Developmental Biology and a Wellcome Trust Principal Research Fellow. She is best known for her pioneering work in developmental genetics, having demonstrated how genetic mutations could be introduced into the mouse germ line through genetically altered embryonic stem cells.
- Samuel Strober (died 2022) was an American physician who was a professor at the Stanford University School of Medicine and co-founder of the biotechnology company Dendreon known for his work on eliminating the need for life long immune suppressive drugs in organ transplant patients.
- Fiona Powrie FRS is currently the head of the Kennedy Institute of Rheumatology at the University of Oxford. Formerly she was the inaugural Sidney Truelove Professor of Gastroenterology at the University of Oxford and the head of the Experimental Medicine Division of the Nuffield Department of Clinical Medicine. Powrie is best known for her seminal studies of regulatory T cells and their role in prevention of immune-mediated pathology, particularly in the context of intestinal inflammation.
- Herman Waldmann FRS is a British immunologist, currently Emeritus Professor of Pathology. Waldmann is known for his work on immune tolerance as they relate to grafts and for development of therapeutic monoclonal antibodies for clinical application.

== See also ==
- List of Overseas Places of Historic Significance to Australia
