= Henry Harris (scientist) =

Australian professor of medicine

Henry Harris FRS, FAA
- Born: 28 January 1925; Russia
- Died: 31 October 2014 (aged 89)
- Education: Royal Prince Alfred Hospital; Sir William Dunn School of Pathology
- Awards: Royal Medal
- Scientific career
- Fields: Biology
- Workplaces: John Innes Institute; University of Oxford
- Thesis: Nature of chemical stimuli affecting cells during tissue injury (1953)
- Doctoral students: Fiona Watt

Sir Henry Harris FRS FAA (28 January 1925 – 31 October 2014) was an Australian professor of medicine at the University of Oxford who led pioneering work on cancer and human genetics from the 1960s through the 2000s.

== Early life and education ==
Harris was born in 1925 to a Jewish family in the Soviet Union. In 1929, his family emigrated to Australia. Harris studied at Sydney Boys High School from 1937 to 1941. In 1941, he first read modern languages, but was subsequently attracted to medicine through his literary interests. He studied medicine at the Royal Prince Alfred Hospital and began a career in medical research rather than in clinical practice.

== Career ==
In the early 1950s, Harris moved to England to study at the Sir William Dunn School of Pathology in Oxford under Howard Florey. He completed his DPhil in 1954 and settled down to a career of academic research. In 1960, he was appointed the head of the new department of cell biology at the John Innes Institute, and, in 1964, he succeeded Florey as head of the Dunn School. In 1979, he was appointed as Oxford's Regius Professor of Medicine, succeeding Richard Doll.

Harris's research interests were primarily focused on cancer cells and their differences from normal cells. He later studied the possibility of genetic modification of human cell lines with the material of other species to increase the range of genetic markers. Harris and his colleagues developed some of the basic techniques for investigating and measuring genes along the human chromosome.

In 1965, he reported his observation that most nuclear RNA was non-coding, a view that was not widely accepted until years later. In 1969, Harris showed that when malignant cancer cells were fused with normal fibroblasts, the resulting hybrids were not malignant, thus demonstrating the existence of genes that could suppress malignancy. Work on these tumour suppressor genes has become a worldwide industry.

In 1983, Harris was elected to the Australian Academy of Science as a Corresponding Fellow. In 1993, he was knighted.

Much of Harris's work has been supported by Cancer Research UK (formerly the Cancer Research Campaign).

He died on 31 October 2014, aged 89.

== Works ==
=== Published books ===
- Harris, Henry (1970). Cell Fusion. Oxford: Clarendon Press. ISBN 978-0-19-857344-9.
- Harris, Henry (1968). Nucleus and Cytoplasm. Oxford: Clarendon Press. ISBN 978-0-19-854125-7.
- Harris, Henry (1979). Scientific Models and Man. Oxford and New York: Clarendon Press and Oxford University Press. ISBN 978-0-19-857168-1.
- Harris, Henry (1987). The Balance of Improbabilities: A Scientific Life. Oxford: Clarendon Press. ISBN 978-0-19-858217-5.
- Harris, Henry (1993). Hippolyte's Club Foot: The Medical Roots of Realism in Modern European Literature. Oxford: Clarendon Press. ISBN 978-0-19-951362-8. (The Romanes Lecture for 1993).
- Harris, Henry (1995). The Cells of the Body: A History of Somatic Cell Genetics. Cold Spring Harbor, N.Y: Cold Spring Harbor Laboratory. ISBN 978-0-87969-533-0.
- Harris, Henry (2000). The Birth of the Cell. Yale University Press. ISBN 978-0-300-08295-1.
- Harris, Henry (2002). Things Come to Life: Spontaneous Generation Revisited. Oxford University Press. ISBN 978-0-19-851538-8.
- Harris, Henry (2006). Remnants of a Quiet Life. Twin Serpents Limited. ISBN 978-1-905524-27-3.
