= List of Overseas Places of Historic Significance to Australia =

The List of Overseas Places of Historic Significance to Australia (LOPHSA) is a list of sites outside Australian jurisdiction deemed to be of outstanding historic significance to Australia. Once on the list the provisions of the Environment Protection and Biodiversity Conservation Act 1999 apply.

In 2007 the first three sites on the List were gazetted. The Villers-Bretonneux Australian National Memorial was considered but ultimately not gazetted.

== List ==
The List of Overseas Places of Historic Significance to Australia comprises the following sites:

| # | Image | Listed place | Country | Date listed | Coordinates | Notes |
|---|---|---|---|---|---|---|
| 1 | | Anzac Cove, Gallipoli (listing) | Turkey | 2007 | 40°14′46″N 26°16′40″E | |
| 2 | | Kokoda Track (listing) | Papua New Guinea | 2007 | 8°52′39.95″S 147°44′14.99″E | |
| 3 | | Howard Florey's Laboratory, Sir William Dunn School of Pathology (listing) | England | 2007 | 51°45′34″N 1°15′05″W | |

== See also ==
- Australian National Heritage List
- Commonwealth Heritage List
- Little Australia
